= Jesper Brodin =

Swedish business executive (born 1968)

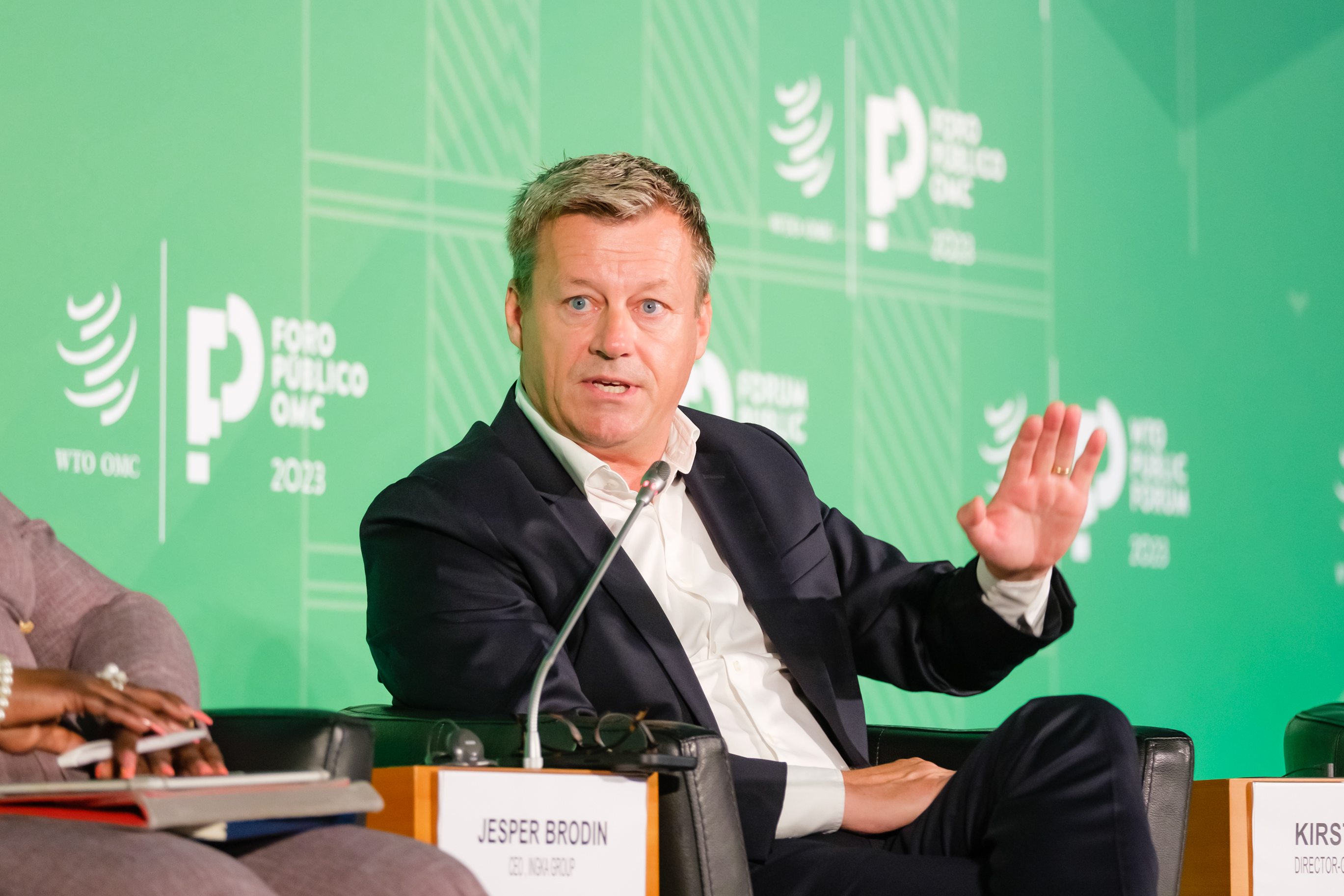
- Born: 9 November 1968 (age 57); Gothenburg, Sweden
- Education: 1994 – M.Sc. Industrial Engineering
- Alma mater: Chalmers University of Technology
- Title: Chief Executive Officer of INGKA Holding
- Term: 2017–2025
- Predecessor: Peter Agnefjäll
- Children: 3

Jesper Brodin (born 9 November 1968) is a Swedish business leader and was the chief executive officer (CEO) of Ingka Group. During his career at IKEA, Brodin has held a number of different roles including assistant to Ingvar Kamprad, Business Area Manager Kitchen and Dining, as well as managing director for Range & Supply, Inter IKEA Group.

== Early life and education ==
Born in 1968 in Gothenburg, Sweden, Brodin graduated with a M.Sc. in Industrial Engineering from Chalmers University of Technology in 1994. He graduated from the University of Gothenburg in 1995.

== Career ==
Brodin has held several positions within Ingka Group. In 1995, Brodin joined IKEA as the company's Purchase Manager in Pakistan. After Pakistan, he became the Range & Supply Manager in Southeast Asia in 1997. In 1999, Brodin assumed the role of assistant to Ingvar Kamprad and Anders Dahlvig, CEO of IKEA Group at the time. In 2008, Brodin moved to China to become Regional Purchase Manager. In 2011 he moved back to Sweden to serve as IKEA Supply Chain Manager at IKEA of Sweden, before becoming CEO of IKEA Range & Supply in 2013.

Brodin succeeded Peter Agnefjäll as CEO of Ingka Group in September 2017. Citing consumer complaints, Brodin pushed for Ikea to invest heavily in online sales, despite the prior CEO's long-term resistance to an online focus.

He was named one of the 100 Most Influential People of 2024 by TIME.

He oversaw the launch of an Ikea market for pre-owned goods in early 2025, tested in several markets.

== Climate advocacy ==
In 2019, Brodin joined The B Team, a nonprofit organization advocating ecological sustainability and humanitarianism in global business practices. He is also the chair of World Economic Forum Alliance of CEO Climate Leaders, a committee of corporate administrators who employ environmentally conscious business strategies. As Ingka CEO, in 2024, he was a signatory on an open letter ahead of the UN COP29 summit calling for government action on climate change.

== Personal life ==
Brodin lives in Helsingborg, Sweden. He and his wife have three children.
