= Inter IKEA Foundation =

Liechtensteinian foundation

- Company type: Foundation
- Founded: 2023
- Founder: Ingvar Kamprad
- Headquarters: Liechtenstein
- Area served: Worldwide
- Subsidiaries: Inter IKEA Holding B.V.
- Website: www.interikeafoundation.com/en

IKEA ownership chart
Flowchart showing the structure and ownership of IKEA companies. Parent companies are at the top of the chart.
Provides services to | Is the parent of | Provides funding to

Inter IKEA Foundation is a foundation registered in Liechtenstein as a Unternehmensstiftung (German: [ʊntɐˈneːmənsˌʃtɪftʊŋ], literally in English: "enterprise foundation"). Its office is located in Vaduz, Liechtenstein. It owns Inter IKEA Holding B.V., registered in the Netherlands, which through its subsidiary Inter IKEA Systems controls the intellectual property of the IKEA brand. Through its subsidiaries, the foundation collects franchise fees of 3% on sales of all IKEA products and also conducts investment activities. In 2011, it was reported that the foundation controlled assets valued at US$15 billion.

== History ==
Interogo Foundation was founded on 29 March 1989 in Vaduz, Liechtenstein. Its aim is to secure the longevity and independence of the IKEA concept and the continued existence of Inter IKEA Holding, as well as to influence the leadership of the company.

The IKEA founder Ingvar Kamprad and his family used to control Interogo Foundation until 2013.

On 1 September 2023, the Inter IKEA Foundation was demerged from the Interogo Foundation.

== Governance ==
The foundation board has at least two members, who at the time of the founding of Interogo Foundation were the lawyers Herbert Oberhuber and Johannes Burger. The foundation may be changed into a company or a trust if circumstances have changed so that this is in the foundation's interests. Meetings of the board are announced by the president of the foundation.

Board members are appointed by the advisory council of Interogo Foundation. In 2013, Ingvar Kamprad resigned from that council and renounced his right to appoint its members. As of 2020, the rules for appointing members of the advisory council state that Kamprad family members may not hold a majority of the seats.

== See also ==
- Inter IKEA Holding
- Interogo Holding
- IKEA
- Stichting INGKA Foundation
