= Churchill Square, Brighton =

Churchill Square
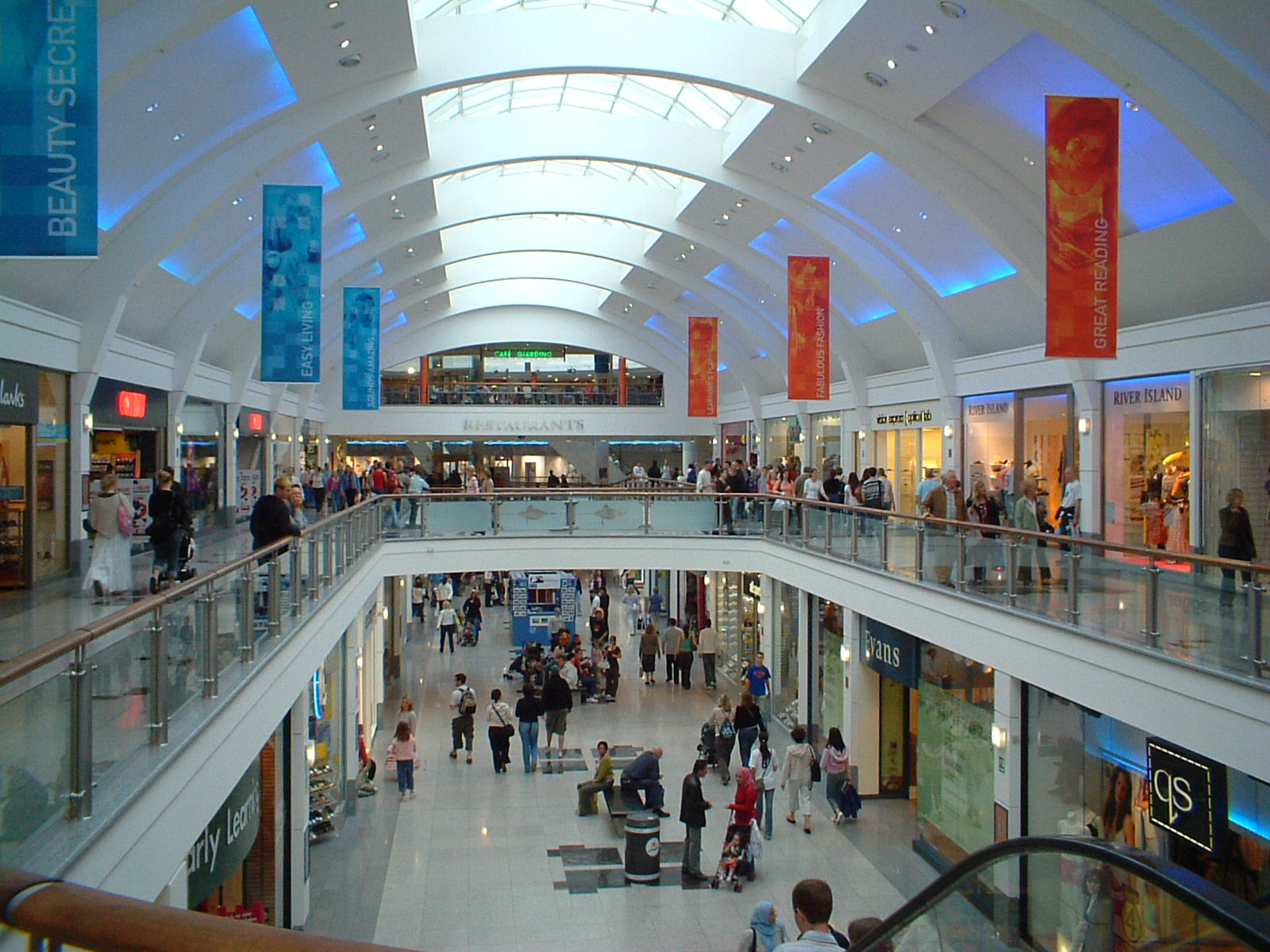
- The shopping centre in 2004
- Location: Brighton, England
- Coordinates: 50°49′23″N 0°08′47″W
- Opened: 1998
- Manager: Ingka Centres Management UK Ltd
- Owner: INGKA Centres
- Num. of stores: 79
- Num. of anchor tenants: 1
- Floors: 3
- Parking: Enclosed car park attached (1600 places)
- Website: churchillsquare.com

Churchill Square is a shopping centre in the centre of Brighton and Hove, a city on the south coast of England. It is at the eastern end of Western Road, near the Clock Tower.

Churchill Square has up to 85 shops (when all are let), in addition to several sites for "open-air" style stalls in the corridors. It is arranged over three floors with only the food court, which has five restaurant spaces, on the uppermost; some of the largest stores occupy two floors. The majority of the shops are chain stores, typical of many other large British shopping centres. Additionally, on the outside piazza there are several food vans.

In November 2023, Churchill Square was bought by INGKA Centres, a division of INGKA Holding, with IKEA confirming plans to open a store at the centre, IKEA later opened in 2025.

== History ==
It was originally built during the 1960s by the architects Russell Diplock & Associates, obscuring several streets. That original centre included low-rise office blocks, a high-rise residential tower (Chartwell Court), shops and a supermarket with open but covered walkways between them. It was majorly rebuilt as an indoor mall, but without the low-rise office blocks. The new centre, which opened in 1998, involved further road closures and changes to the underlying street layout.

In 2023, it was announced that the former Topshop store, which had been closed since 2021, would be turned into a huge food and drinks venue for almost 500 people called The Botanist, part of a national chain of more than 30 gastropubs. As well as a new shopfront and changes to the internal layout, the venue is expected to have outdoor seating on the roof.

In November 2023, Churchill Square was bought by INGKA Holding, the co-owner of IKEA, who also acquired Chartwell Court and two car parks which are attached to the centre under its INGKA Centres division. Following the announcement of the centre's acquisition, IKEA confirmed plans to open a "City Store" at the former Debenhams' site. The store will have a Swedish Deli, in-store planning services and around 6,000 products on display, 3,000 of which will be available for immediate purchase.

== Access ==
Churchill Square is accessible by most bus services in Brighton outside the main entrances, or a five- to ten-minute walk from Brighton Station, or by car (there are two car parks; the Orange car park located on the lower levels of the centre, the entrance to which is located on Regency Road off of West Street, and the Green car park on the side of the centre, the entrance to which is located on Cannon Place), or by taxi (there is a small taxi rank in Queen Square on the other side of Western Road).

== Anchors ==
- IKEA. A smaller, concept IKEA store replaced the Debenhams anchor tenant in 2025.
- Debenhams. Debenhams was one of the major anchor stores from 1998 until its collapse in 2021 and was replaced by IKEA in 2025.
- British Home Stores (BHS). BHS was one of the major anchor stores until its collapse in 2016. Its lot was replaced by Zara, which is not an anchor.
- Topshop & Topman was one of the major anchor stores from 2014 until its collapse in 2021 after the brand was sold to ASOS after the Arcadia Group entered administration. The unit was ultimateley replaced by H&M in 2026.
