= Matkus Shopping Center =

- Kauppakeskus Matkus
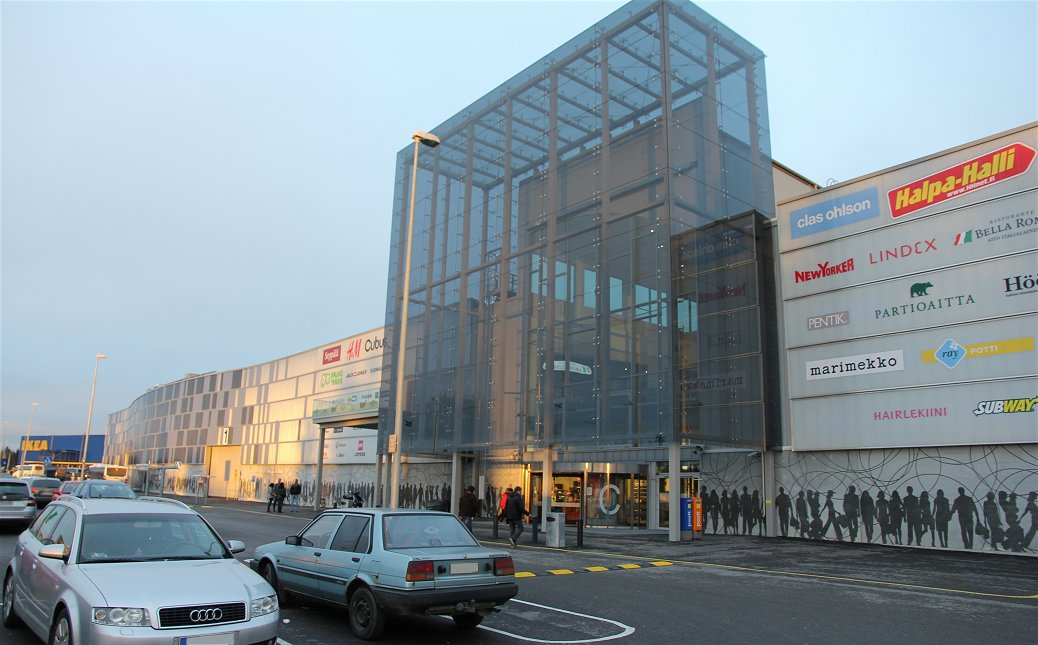
- One of the entrances of Matkus
- Location: Hiltulanlahti, Kuopio, Finland
- Coordinates: 62°49′24″N 27°36′16″E
- Address: Matkuksentie 60
- Opened: November 1, 2012
- Owner: INGKA Centres
- Num. of stores: about 70-90
- Floor area: 48,000 m²
- Floors: 2
- Parking: 3,000
- Public transit: Bus
- Website: www.matkusshoppingcenter.fi/en/

The Matkus Shopping Center (Finnish: Kauppakeskus Matkus) is a shopping mall in the southern part of Kuopio, Finland, located 11 kilometres (6.8 mi) south of its city center along the Highway 5 (E63), in the Matkus business area of the Hiltulanlahti district. It is the fifth largest business center in Finland. On bus line 25 (including 25A and 25X) from the Kuopio Market Square directly to the shopping center.

The mall was opened on November 1, 2012. The shopping center have about 70-90 stores, and it belongs to INGKA Centres, a division of INGKA Holding. The shops are positioned according to a concept, so all the sports stores, for example, will be together to make it easier for customers to find the things they are looking for. The fashion boutiques will be sited according to their target groups.

In the summer 2020, the Kuopio-themed Olopuisto outdoor activity park was completed, right next to the shopping center.
