= Waldemar Aspelin =

Finnish architect

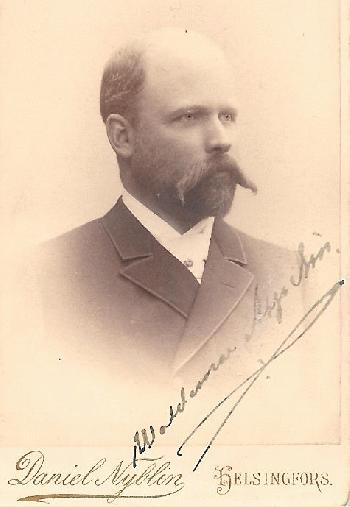
- Waldemar Aspelin about 1911
- Born: 26 September 1854; Salo, Grand Duchy of Finland, Russian Empire
- Died: 10 November 1923 (aged 69); Helsinki, Finland
- Occupation: Architect
- Practice: apartment houses, residences, office buildings, transport infrastructure in Finland
- Buildings: Donner House; Helsinki tram hall; Fazer's confectionery factory; Public Radio Building; Consul Rothe House

Waldemar Johannes Aspelin (Koski, Perniö, (now Salo), Finland, 26 September 1854 – Helsinki, 10 November 1923) was a Finnish architect.

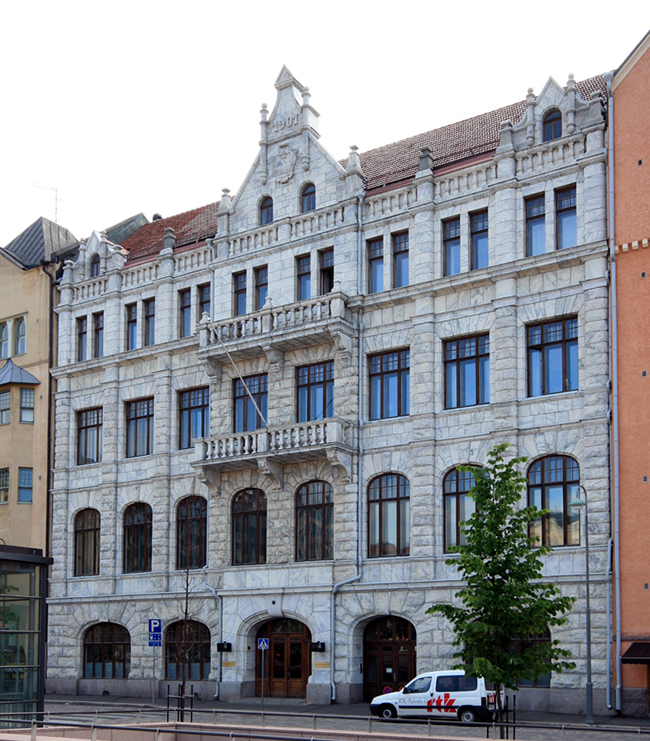
The former Public Radio headquarters (current building of the Supreme Administrative Court) at Fabianinkatu 15 in Helsinki was designed by Waldemar Aspelin and completed in 1901.

Waldemar Aspelin was born in the mining community of Koski, about halfway between Helsinki and Turku, then in the Grand Duchy of Finland, part of the Russian Empire. His parents were Wilhelm Aspelin, a factory manager, and Amalia Borgström. Aspelin first attended Borås Technical College in Sweden and then practiced as an architect for five years in the office of architect Theodor Höijer. He studied from 1883 to 1886 in Helsinki at the Helsinki Polytechnical Institute, where instruction in architecture had begun only in 1872. During his studies in Helsinki, he worked as an intern partly for architect Frans Sjöström and partly for architect Gustaf Nyström, two of the most important Finnish architects of the era. In 1887, Aspelin founded his own architectural office in Hamina, but moved it to Helsinki in 1889. From 1894 he shared an office with Carl Ricardo Björnberg.

Aspelin also worked as a drawing teacher at the Taideteollinen Korkeakoulu (University of Arts and Sciences; now Aalto University School of Arts, Design and Architecture) in Helsinki. He designed the 1904 Art Nouveau Paulig girl Paula-tyttö advertising figure in Finnish national dress for Paulig's 10 kilo coffee cans. The story goes that Gustav Paulig, the founder of the coffee roasting company, met a beautiful girl in national costume in Sääksmäki, whose image he wanted on the side of a coffee can, and asked Aspelin to draw her.

== Career ==
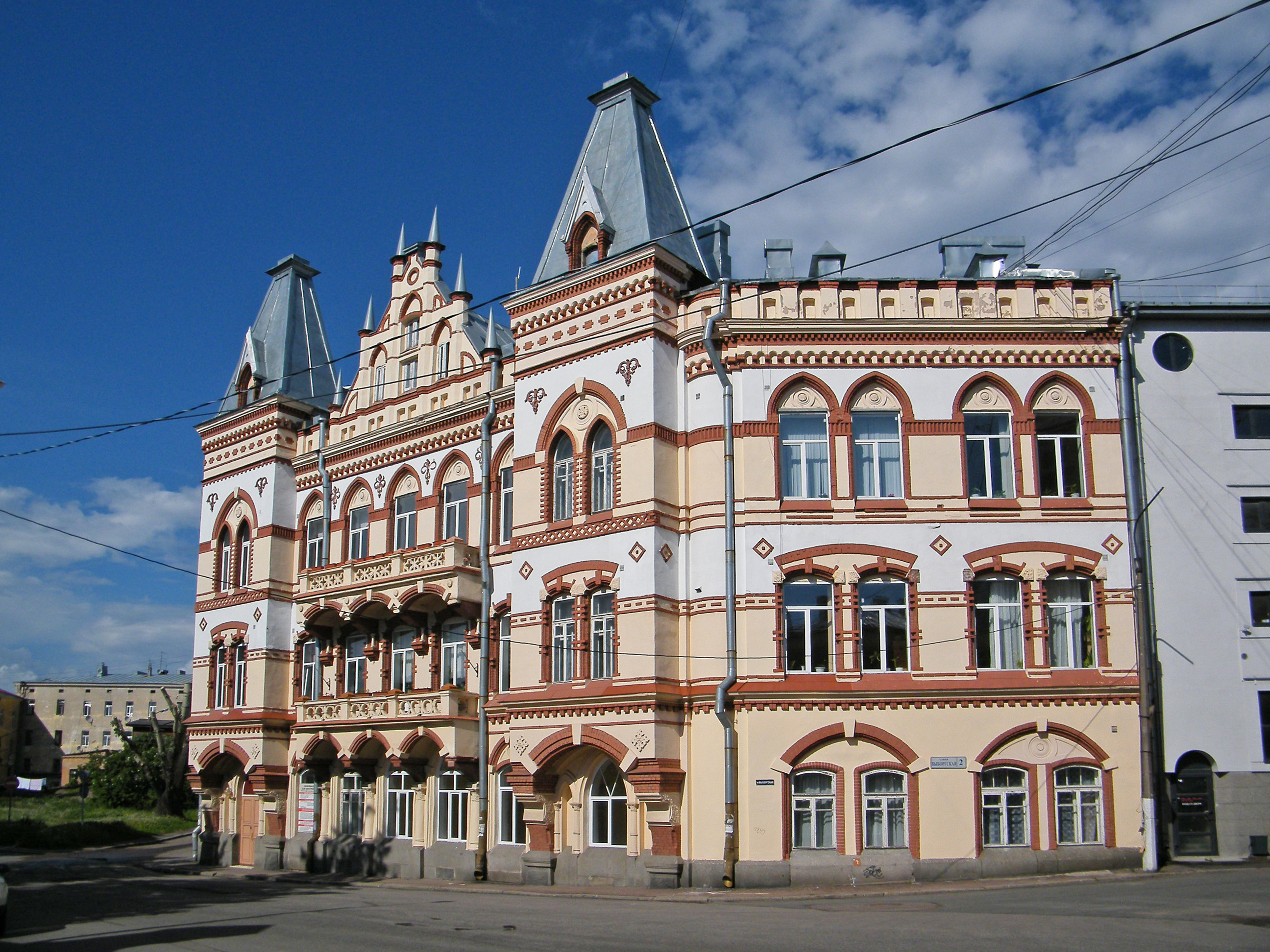
Aspelin's house for German Consul Emil Rothe in Vyborg, Russia, built 1897–1900.

Aspelin designed residential and commercial buildings in different parts of the old inner city of Helsinki; for example, on Puistokatu, Bulevardi and Yrjönkatu. In the spirit of liberalism, construction was quite free and was only regulated by the city's street plan and building layout. The number of stone buildings in Helsinki tripled from 1880 to 1910, as the modern city underwent rapid growth to reach a population of around 100,000 inhabitants that replaced what had been an agrarian trading post. Apartment buildings replaced the spacious houses of the city core. Central European compactness and closed street views became the norm. While the outskirts of Helsinki had been located near the current parliament building before the expansion, the growth of both industrialization and international trade brought many new residents and new manufacturing facilities to these outer districts, which required new apartment buildings. Most of the striking new urban architecture was constructed by mostly private developers. Most of the large private villas used a traditional decorative Nordic wooden architecture.

Aspelin was the beneficiary of the need for new housing, both for modest tenants and wealthy clients. His most famous of the commissions is the Donner House, designed in partnership with Edinburgh architect Robert S. Lorimer. The building is also known as the Svenska Klubben (Swedish Club) building. Aspelin was asked by industrialist and engineer Ossian Donner to design the house as a gift for Donner's Scottish wife Violet Marion MacHutchen, possibly to alleviate her homesickness; as such, the house is built of brick in a Scottish Baronial style.

Aspelin played a significant role in the development of Helsinki's transit infrastructure. In 1900, he was hired by the Helsinki Raitiotie ja omnibus-Osakeyhtiö, the municipal tram company. When the tram lines were electrified at the turn of the century, Aspelin was tasked with designing this hall for electric trolleys. The company had started public horse-drawn bus service in 1888 and horse-drawn tram service soon after. The handsome tram terminal, with arched windows, is located at the corner of Töölönkatu and Eino Leino street. After designing this structure, Aspelin was given the task of designing a residential building project for the staff of the tram company. It was located at the corner of Turunmaantie, today's Mannerheimintie and Humalistonkatu, and was nicknamed "Sipoo Church". The building was externally impressive, but the living conditions were unattractive. Most of the apartments were studios without electric heating and toilets. Almost every family still had a subtenant in their rental unit. Unsurprisingly, the complex was demolished in 1978.

The buildings by Aspelin in Vyborg, Russia, are also of note. The Consul Rothe House (1897–1900) is a significant part of the skyline of the city facing the sea, between Yuzhny Val, Podgornaya and Vyborgskaya streets. He was also responsible for the monumental building of the Nordic Share Bank (completed in 1900) at the corner of Theater and Market Squares. According to the art historian Evgeny Evgenievich Kepp, the architect unsuccessfully insisted on the demolition of the historic Round Tower, which obscures the neo-Renaissance facade of the bank. Later studies do not find documentary evidence of this, claiming that Berndt Ivar Aminoff was the architect who insisted upon the tower's demolition. Aminoff was also, however, known to be critical of the artistic merits of Aspelin's bank building.

Aspelin is a representative of the revival styles of the nineteenth century, but his later buildings can sometimes be described as Art Nouveau (often called Jugendstil). However, he was not so much interested in a particular style, but focused on fulfilling the wishes of his clients and producing solid, functional architecture. Also in Hanko, Aspelin designed several villas area of Kylpyläpuisto at the turn of the century, and did the remodeling of Hanko's spa facility in 1910.

== Selected buildings ==
- Aladdin House, Raatihuoneontori, Hamina, 1889
- Main building of the Karlberg Manor, Aulanko, 1890
- Brenner House, Eteläranta 4 – Unioninkatu 5, Helsinki, 1891, 1897
- Finn Public School, Espoonkartano, Espoo, 1896
- Fiskars Lukaali, Fiskari, 1896
- The interior of Privatbanken's office, Helsinki, 1896
- Extension of the main building of the Nordsjö Manor, 1897
- Consul Emil Rothe House, Vyborg, 1897–1900
- Fazer's confectionery factory, Tehtaankatu, Helsinki, 1898. Firms in the advertising and filmmaking industries work in the premises today.
- Nordic Share Bank, Vyborg, 1898–1900
- Donner House on Liisankatu in Kruununhaka, Helsinki, 1900
- The tram hall (now Ratikkamuseo), Töölönkatu 51 A, Helsinki, 1900
- Fabianinkatu 15, Helsinki, 1901 (served as the Yleisradio [Public Radio] office building 1934–1981; now the Supreme Administrative Court)
- Fiskars granary, 1902
- Helsinki Raitiotie- ja Omnibus Osakeyhtiö's residential building "Sipoo kirkko," Mannerheimintie 76, Helsinki
- Aulango observation tower, Hämeenlinna, 1906–1907
- Main building of Ahdenkallio Manor, Hyvinkää, 1906
- Main building of Koivumäki Manor, Hiltulanlahti, Kuopio 1907
- Laivurinkatu 7 (Nordic Share Bank, later port office of Kotka city), Kotka, 1908
- Hanko water tower, Hanko 1910 (destroyed 1940–41)
- Paulig office, Satamakatu 11, Helsinki
