= Interogo Holding =

Holding company owned by the Interogo Foundation

Interogo Holding A.G.
- Type: Holding company
- Industry: Investment
- Founded: 2016
- Headquarters: Switzerland
- Parent: Interogo Foundation
- Subsidiaries: Nalka Invest A.B. Vastint Holding B.V. Inter Fund Management S.A.
- Website: www.interogoholding.com

IKEA ownership chart
Flowchart showing the structure and ownership of IKEA companies. Parent companies are at the top of the chart.
Provides services to | Is the parent of | Provides funding to

Interogo Holding A.G. is a holding company that is fully owned by the Interogo Foundation. The business focus is on financial and property investments. The company was created after it was spun off from Inter IKEA Holding.

== History ==
The company was founded in 2016 after the Interogo Foundation split its non–IKEA-related companies from its IKEA-related companies (Inter IKEA Holding) into Interogo Holding A.G. These primarily include property and financial investments.

== Subsidiaries ==
=== Vastint Holding ===
Vastint Holding B.V. develops and manages property in Europe. It focuses on the development of commercial property. This includes the selling and developing residential properties. They manage or developed several offices, hotels and residential properties. The company was founded in 1989. It is based in The Netherlands.

=== Inter Fund Management ===
Inter Fund Management S.A. manages funds on behalf of subsidiaries of Interogo Foundation. These primarily consist of the companies relating to the IKEA brand, such as Inter Ikea Holding and its subsidiaries. It was founded in 1998 and has 50 workers. It is based in Luxembourg.

=== Nalka Invest ===
Nalka Invest A.B. is an investment firm that invests in small and medium-sized businesses generally in the Nordic region. It invests in private companies. It was founded in 2015 and is based in Stockholm, Sweden. Some of their investments are Cibes Lift, Lekolar, Eson Pac, Brunngard, Intrac and others. They have a total of 12 companies in their portfolio, all of which are Nordic. They have also exited some partnerships including ones with Hermods and Scorett. The company has 14 staff, or 2600 staff when including their entire portfolio.
