= Livat Hammersmith =

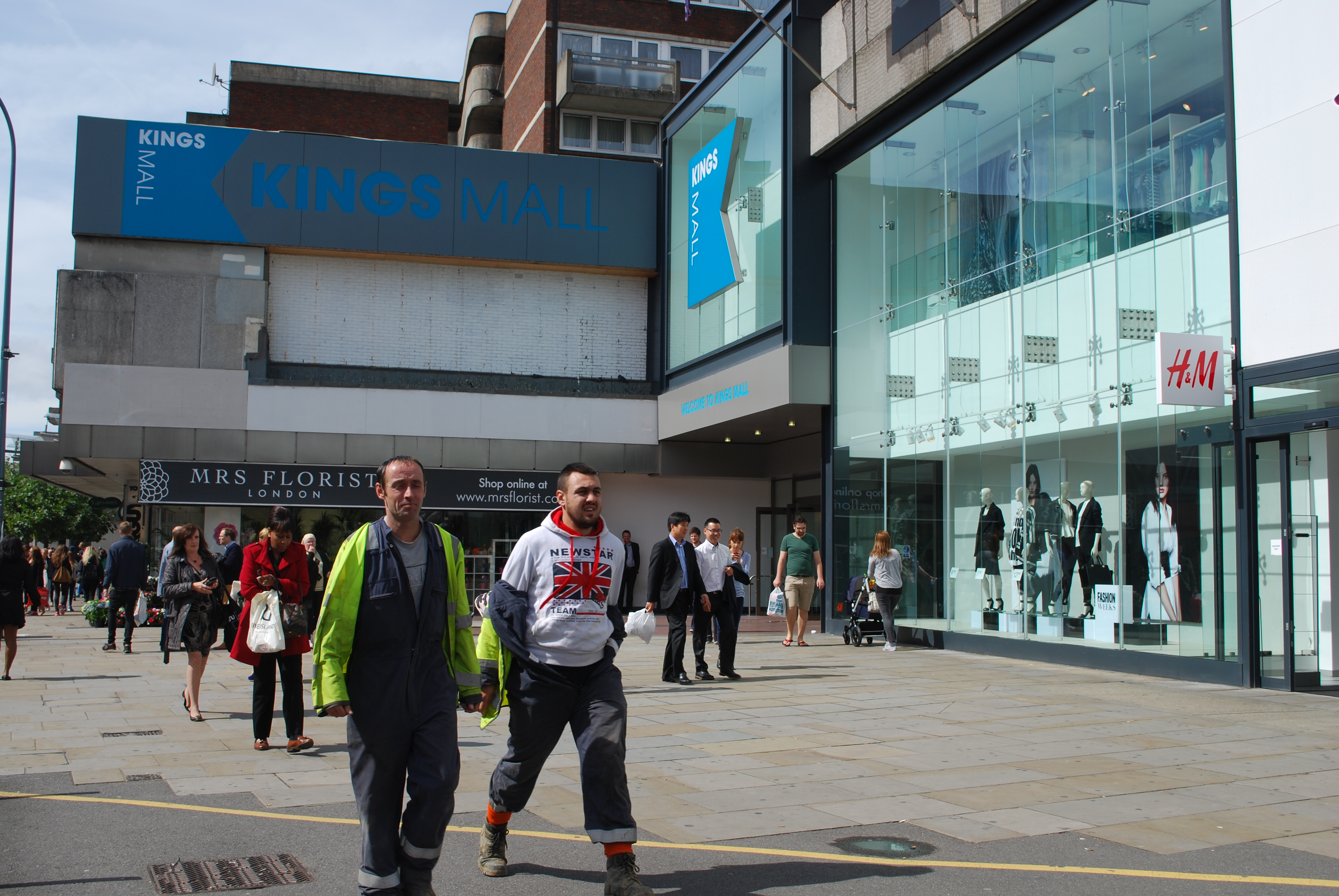
- East entrance of Livat Hammersmith on King Street, Hammersmith, 2014
- Location: King Street, Hammersmith, London, England
- Coordinates: 51.49300°N 0.22800°W
- Opened: 1979; 47 years ago
- Developer: St Martins Property Group
- Manager: Ingka Centres Management UK Ltd
- Owner: INGKA Centres
- Num. of stores: 27
- Num. of anchor tenants: 3
- Floor area: 292,057 sq ft (27,133.0 m^{2})
- Floors: 1
- Parking: 604 parking spaces
- Website: www.livat.com/hammersmith/en

Livat Hammersmith, formerly known as the Kings Mall, is a retail, residential and office complex located off King Street in Hammersmith in the London Borough of Hammersmith and Fulham. Along with the other Livat Centres, it is operated by the Ingka Centres division of INGKA Holding.

The complex consists of a shopping centre, car park, Ashcroft Square and Sovereign Court housing estates, and the One Lyric Square office building.

The shopping centre part of the complex's anchor tenants are IKEA, Primark and Sainsbury's.

== History ==
The complex was designed by Richard Seifert and developed by St Martins Property Group. Residential apartments situated above the mall were constructed in 1973, whilst the shopping centre itself was officially opened on 3 April 1979 by Diana Dors and the then Mayor of Hammersmith. The development originally came with a 950-space car park. It also included two office buildings constructed in the mid 1970s.

The five-acre site is split into two parts. The southern part, containing the main shopping centre, the original housing estate above it and one of the office buildings, is situated off King Street, to the south of the Hammersmith & City line railway line, and located between Lyric Square to the east and Leamore Street to the west. The northern part, originally containing the car park and other office building, is located to the north of the Hammersmith & City line railway line off Glenthorne Road, with Beadon Road to the east and Leamore Street to the west. The northern and southern parts of the complex are linked via a covered footbridge over the District line and Picadilly line railway lines at the first floor level of the shopping centre. The only other amenities at the first floor level are public toilets and access to the original housing estate.

In 2011, the owner of Kings Mall, St Martins Property Group sold it to Matterhorn Capital for £115 million.

In June 2015, Matterhorn Capital sold the shopping centre on to Schroders for £153 million.

In 2016, the car park and one of the office buildings were demolished and replaced with a smaller 753-space car park with new residential apartments situated above it.

As of 2019, the centre is currently undergoing a multimillion-pound transformation. This includes removing the external staircases to the flats above outside each of the entrances to the shopping centre off King Street, and a complete internal refurbishment of the shopping arcade.

In January 2020, INGKA Centres (a division of INGKA Holding) purchased the centre, the centre went through another major £170 million transformation with intentions of it becoming more of a place to meet rather than a shopping centre, becoming one of their Livat centres (the first Livat centre outside of China) and IKEA opening a new store which would take up a huge portion of the centre, the centre was reopened under the Livat brand on 4 February 2022 alongside the new IKEA store.

== Car park ==
The car park serves Livat Hammersmith and the wider Hammersmith area. It is situated to the rear of the development off Glenthorne Road, on the other side of the Hammersmith & City line railway line.

=== Original car park ===
When Kings Mall opened in 1980, it originally came with a 950-space four storey multi-storey car park developed by St Martins Property Group. The size of this car park meant that not only could it serve the customers of the Kings Mall Shopping Centre, but it could also be used by people visiting other areas in Hammersmith town centre or even commuters using the Hammersmith tube stations.

=== Current car park ===
When St Martins Property Group sold Kings Mall in 2011 to Matterhorn Capital, plans were drawn up to demolish the multi-storey car park off Glenthorne Road along with the adjacent West 45 office building off Beadon Road, and replace it with a mixed use development by St George (part of Berkeley Group Holdings), to be called Sovereign Court. The plans include erecting a single building with heights ranging from 4–17 storeys, plus two basement levels, to provide a smaller 700-space replacement public basement car park, new ground floor commercial floorspace and 418 new homes with 53 residential parking spaces and 460 cycle spaces.

== Residential apartments ==
Livat Hammersmith is home to two housing estates: Ashcroft Square and Sovereign Court.

=== Ashcroft Square ===
Ashcroft Square is a local authority housing estate which consists of seven blocks of flats arranged around a central courtyard. The development is situated right on top of the main shopping centre itself. It was originally built in 1973 by St Martins Property Group and the dwellings were constructed using brick and concrete.

The flats are leased to Hammersmith and Fulham London Borough Council on full repairing and insuring leases, with responsibility for repairs and maintenance being split between the landlord and the council.

=== Sovereign Court ===
Sovereign Court is a luxury housing estate which is situated on the other side of the Hammersmith & City line railway line with the basement car park beneath it. It was originally built in 2019 by St George (part of Berkeley Group Holdings).

It is one large building with heights ranging from 4–17 storeys comprising 418 luxury apartments with 53 residential parking spaces and 460 cycle spaces.

== Office buildings ==
Livat Hammersmith has also been home to two office buildings: One Lyric Square and West 45.

=== One Lyric Square ===
One Lyric Square is a 14-storey Grade A office building consisting of 100,656 sq ft (9,351.2 m^{2}) of accommodation. It was constructed in the mid 1970s and is situated adjacent to the east side of the Kings Mall Shopping Centre, taking its name from the Lyric Square market place area situated in front of it.

As of 2019 the first eight floors are leased to The Office Group.

=== West 45 ===
West 45 was a former eight storey office building consisting of 62,244 sq ft (5,782.7 m^{2}) of accommodation with each upper floor having approximately 8,100 sq ft (750 m^{2}) of office space. It was constructed in the mid 1970s and is situated off Beadon Road on the other side of the Hammersmith & City line railway line.

It was demolished in 2014 to make way for the Sovereign Court housing development.

== Transport connections ==
Livat Hammersmith is easily accessible by both private and public transport:

- London Underground: Two Underground stations serve the centre – both the Hammersmith Broadway (housing the Piccadilly and District lines tube station), and the separate Hammersmith & City and Circle lines tube station located on the other side of the A315 road, are only a short walk away.
- Bus: Bus stop U is located outside Unit 1 49-63 King Street (currently occupied by Poundland, and previously occupied by Sainsbury's Central and then HMV), opposite the east entrance of the Kings Mall Shopping Centre. It is served by routes 27, 190, 266, 267, 391, H91, N9 and N11.
- Road links: The development has a car park. This is accessed via turning right off King Street (after travelling past the entire centre and Leamore Street), onto Cambridge Grove and then turning right again onto Glenthorne Road, past the other side of Leamore Street with the car park situated on the right beneath Sovereign Court.

== Gallery ==
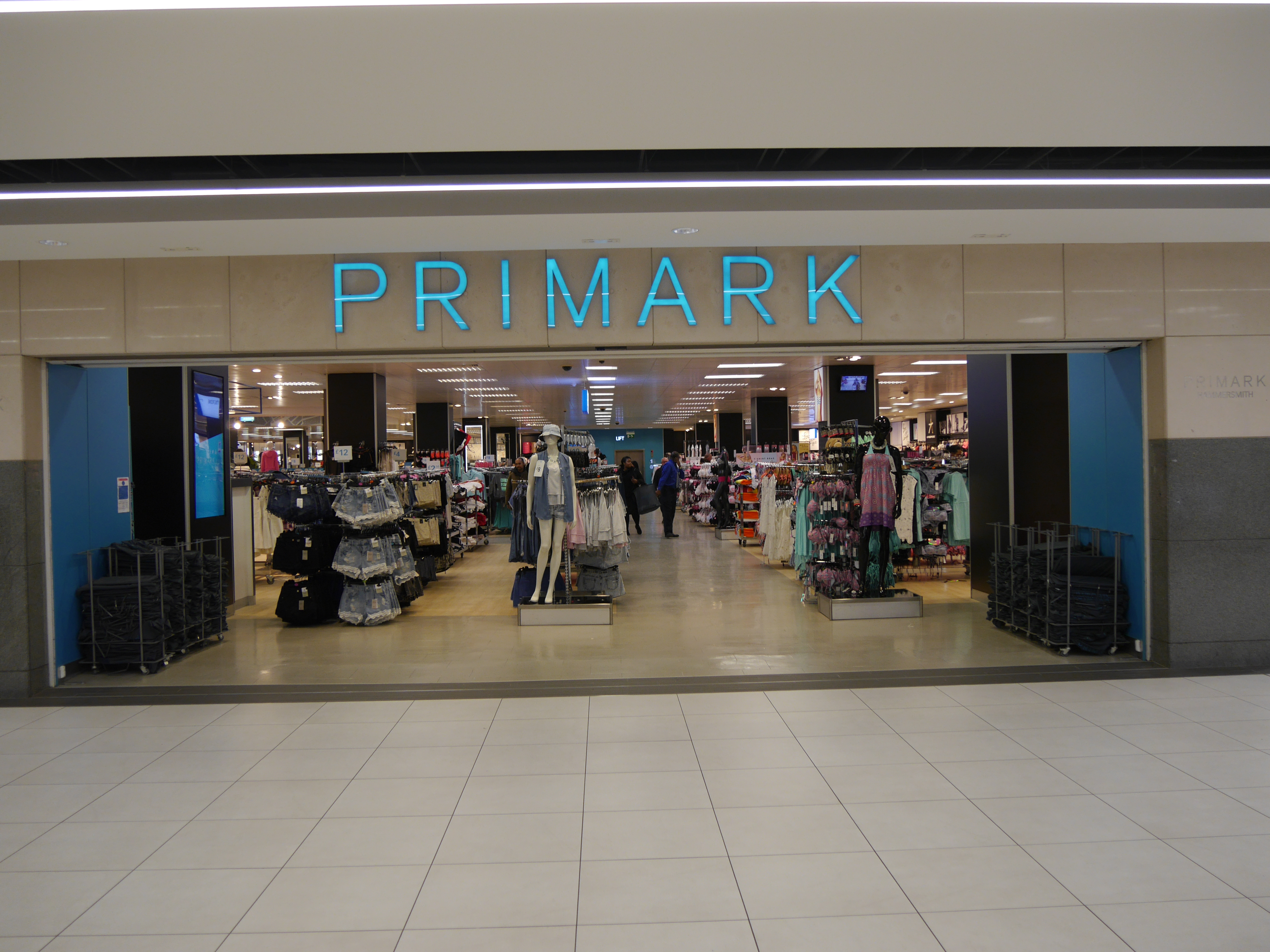
Primark in Kings Mall (shopping arcade entrance)

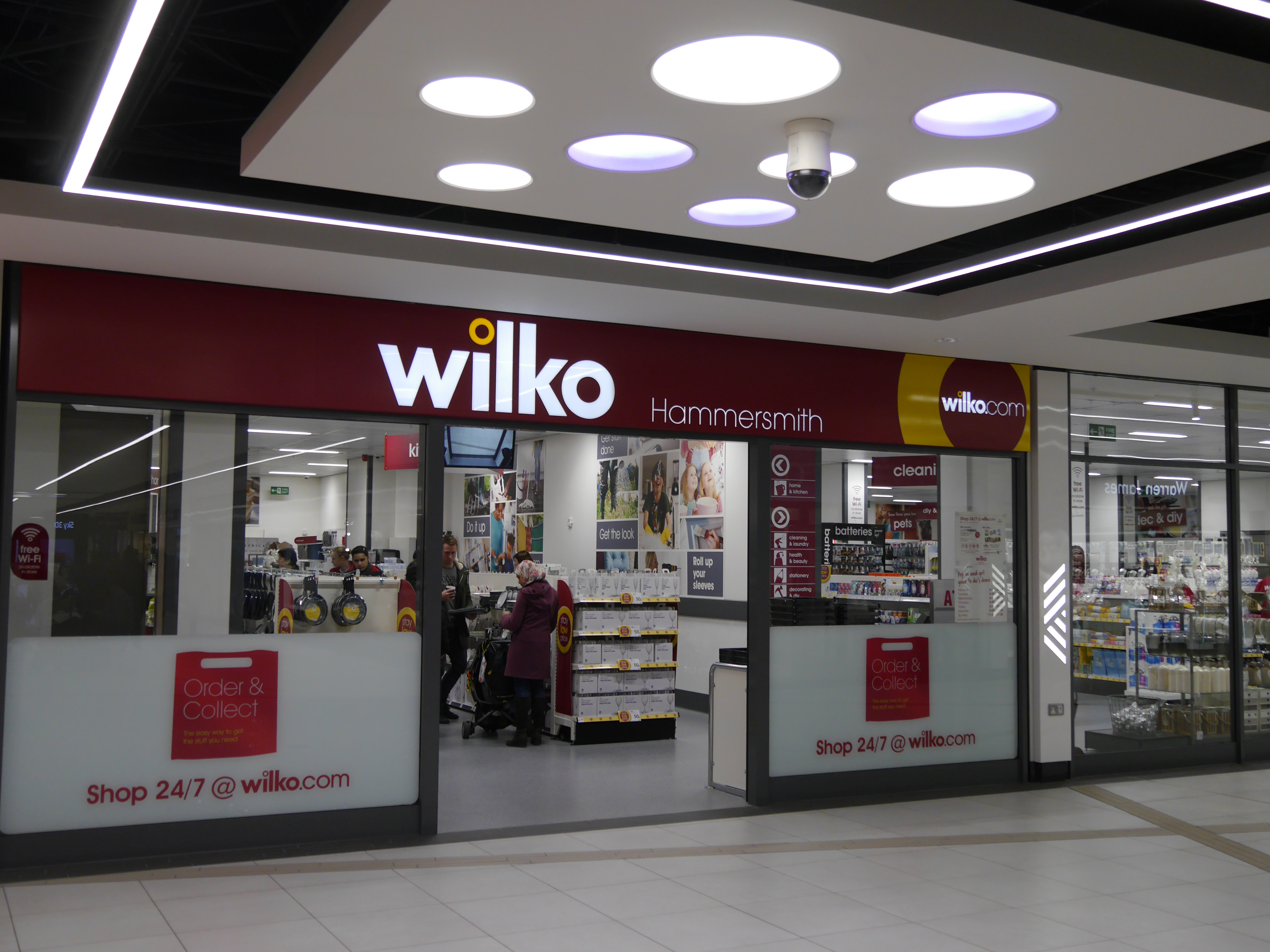
Wilko in Kings Mall shopping arcade

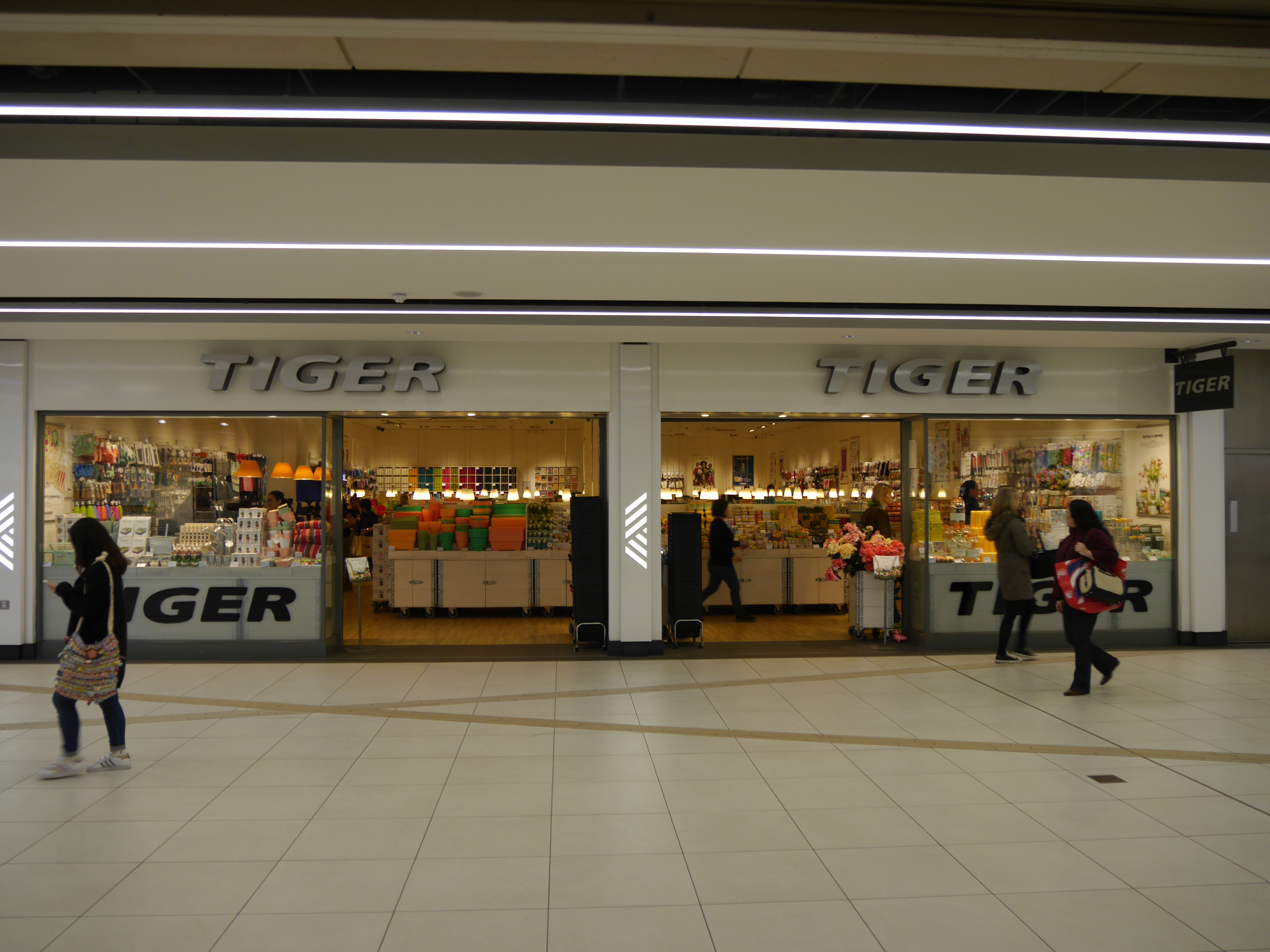
Tiger in Kings Mall shopping arcade

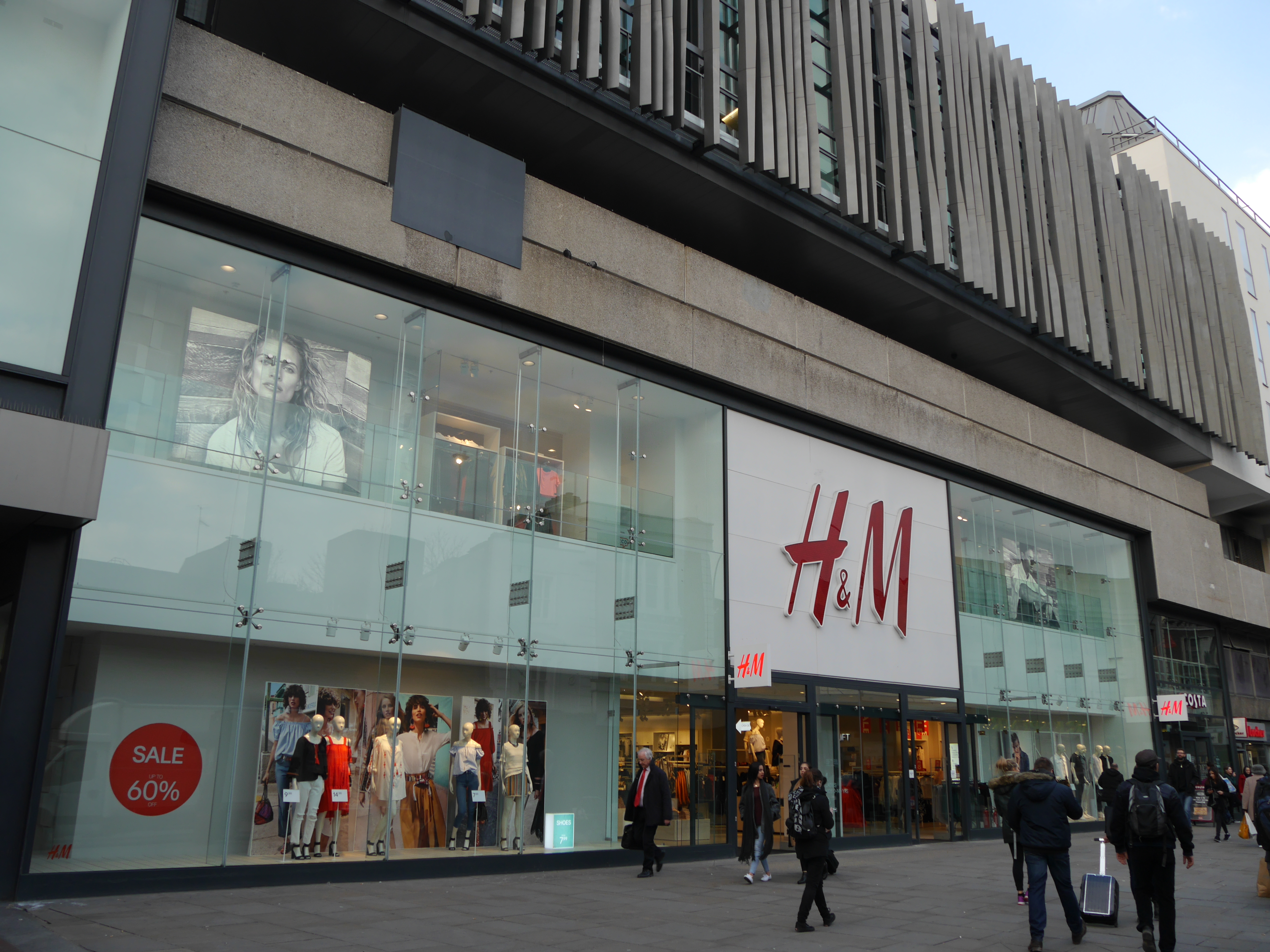
H&M in Kings Mall (King Street entrance)

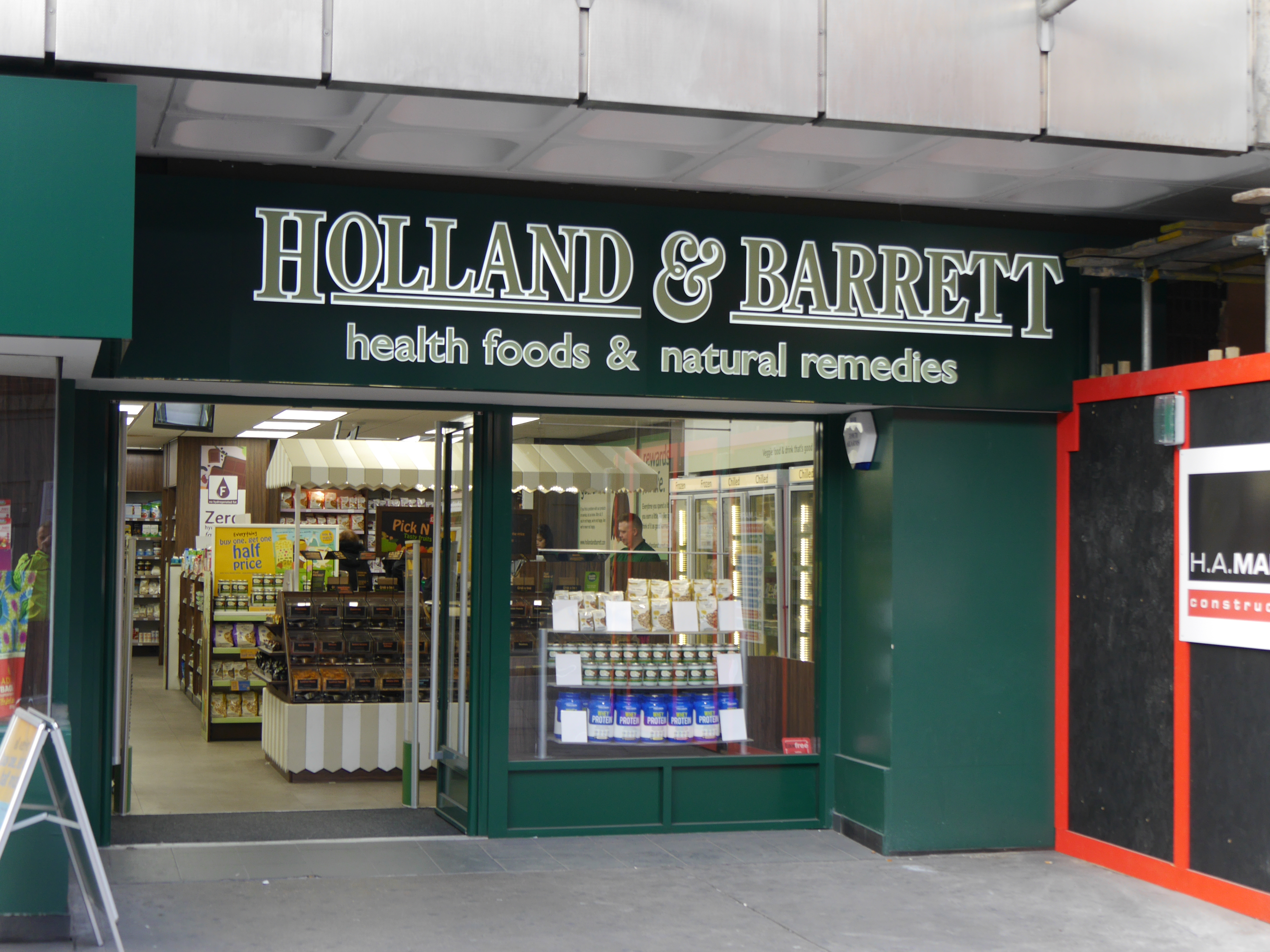
Holland & Barrett in Kings Mall (King Street entrance)

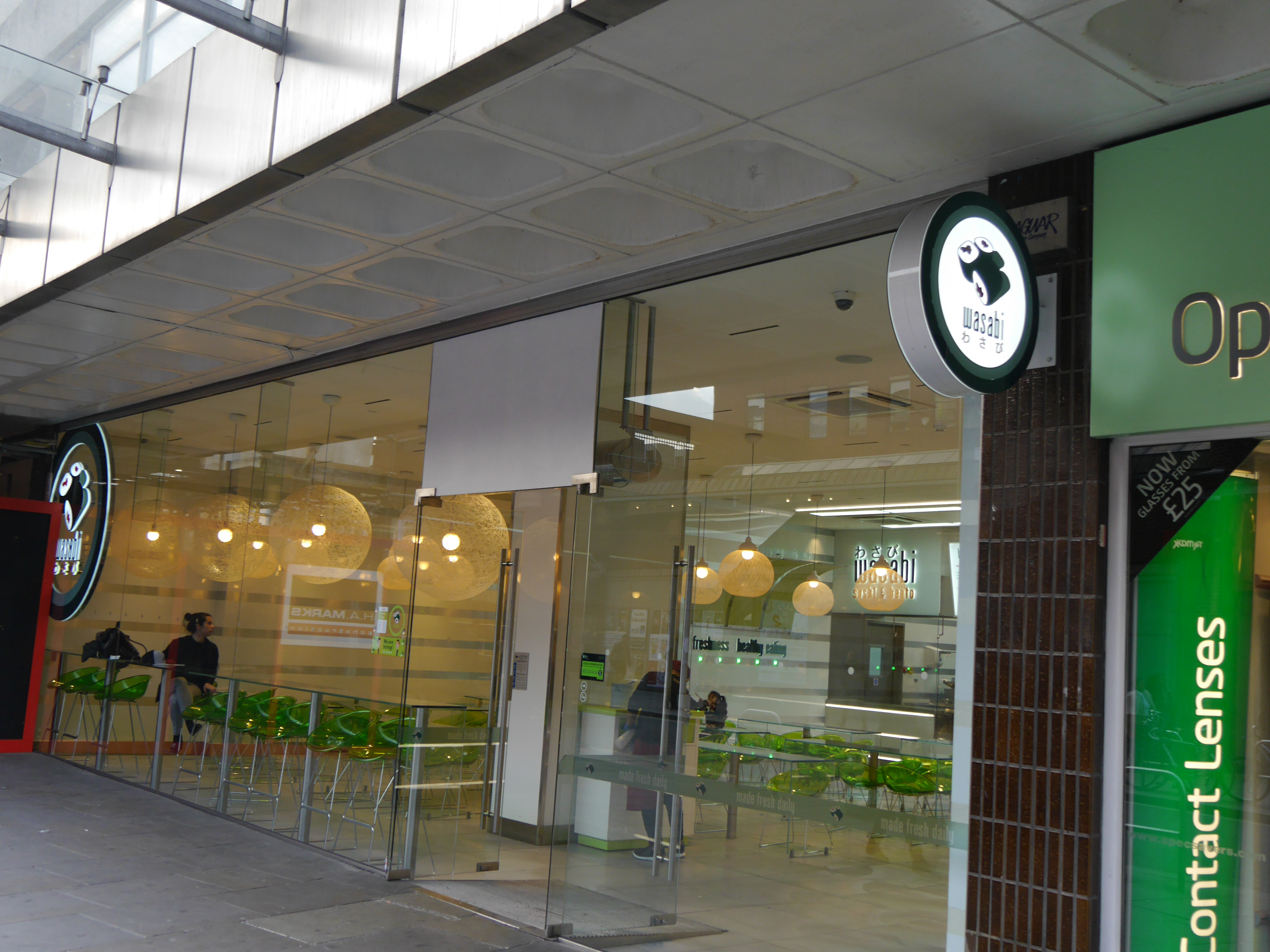
Wasabi in Kings Mall (King Street entrance)

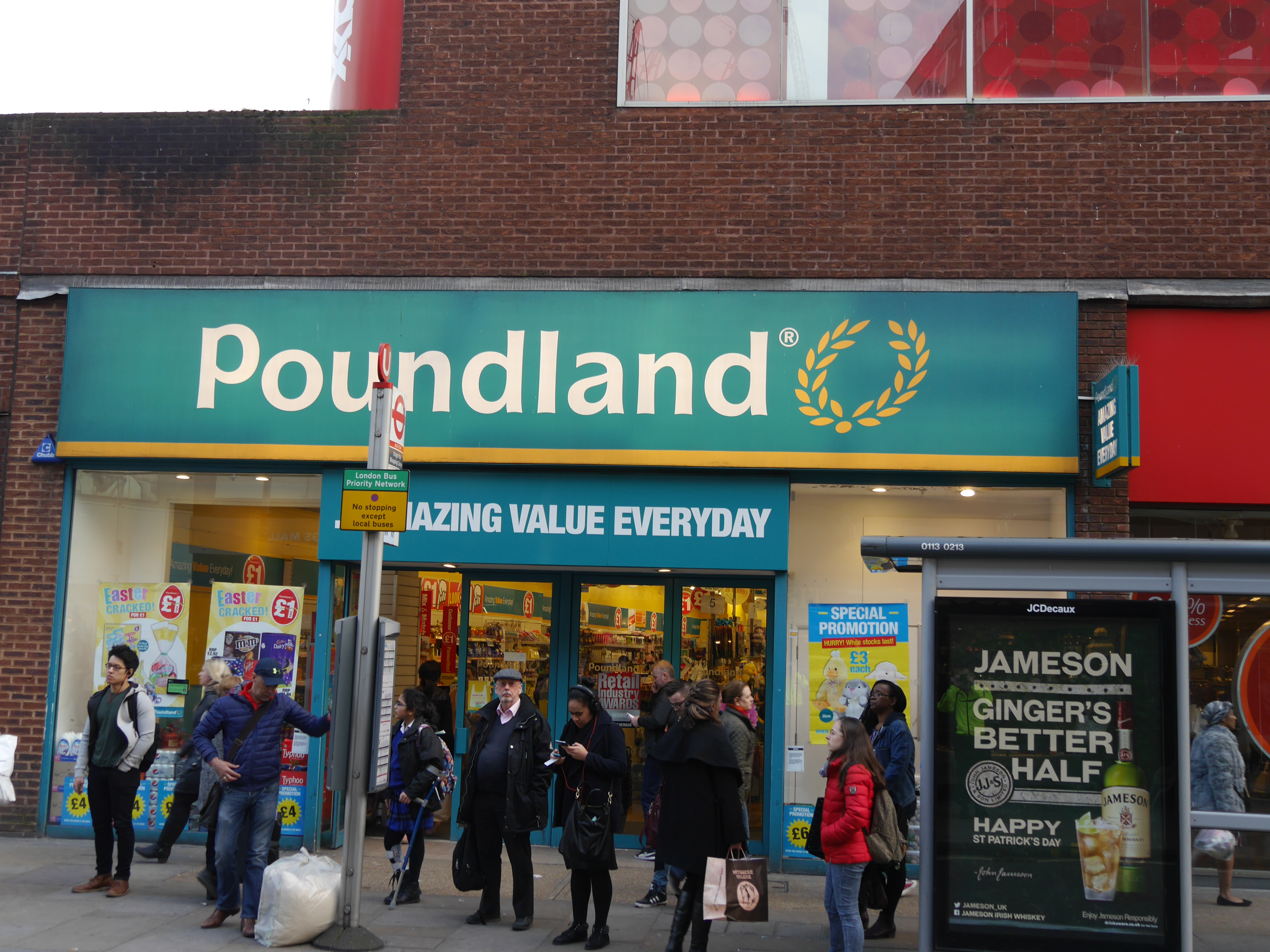
Kings Mall Shopping Centre U bus stop, outside Poundland, Unit 1 49-63 King Street, opposite the Kings Mall east entrance

== See also ==
- List of shopping centres in the United Kingdom
