= Clarendon Hotel, Hammersmith =

Former hotel in London, England

Clarendon Hotel
- Hammersmith Clarendon
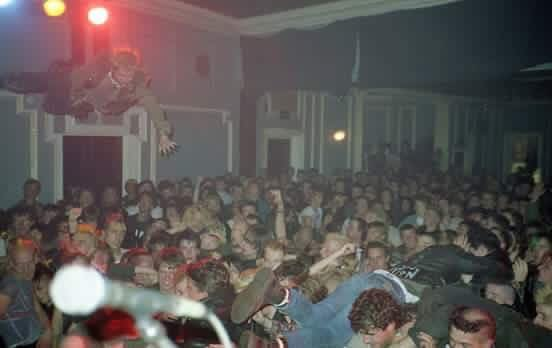
- Clarendon Hotel Ballroom, late 1980s
- Interactive map of Clarendon Hotel
- Address: 5 Hammersmith Broadway; Hammersmith, London W6 7AB; England
- Coordinates: 51°29′35.23″N 00°13′25.44″W
- Type: Dance hall, music venue, nightclub
- Event: Entertainment
- Public transit: Hammersmith tube station

Construction
- Closed: 1 July 1988
- Demolished: 1989

The Clarendon Hotel (also The Clarendon Arms) was a hotel, restaurant, bar and music venue at 5 Hammersmith Broadway, Hammersmith, London W6.

== History ==
Previously known as "The Goat" and "The Suspension Bridge", its construction date is unknown. Census records in Hammersmith show it operated as a licensed Public House at least as early as 1863 and a 1950s brochure proclaimed it was "FAMOUS AS A RENDEZVOUS FOR OVER 100 YEARS" (see pictures). It closed in 1988 and was demolished to make way for the new Hammersmith Broadway Centre.

== Music Venue ==
It was used extensively as a music venue in the post-World War II era, initially upstairs in its American Bar and Ballroom and then downstairs in the basement Broadway Bar. From the 1950s to 1970s, it was home to London's country music scene, where bands such as The Westsiders, The Grovers, The Miller Brothers, The Hillsiders, The Westernaires & The Ranchers played regularly.

After punk appeared in the mid-1970s, it became a major hub of the underground and alternative music scene. In the 1980s, bands such as U2, Pulp, Ramones, Birthday Party, Primal Scream, Damned, Sisters of Mercy, Cramps, Meteors, Television Personalities, Big Black (posthumously released as the live album Pigpile), Doctor and the Medics, Dead Can Dance, Ghost Dance, Blyth Power, Killing Joke, Subhumans, Hanoi Rocks, Butthole Surfers and Xmal Deutschland gave one-off or rare performances. Bands from the burgeoning thrash, heavy metal, punk, hardcore, indie and alternative music scenes were regular performers.

It was most famous as home to London's psychobilly scene, which grew out of the Country & Western and rockabilly scenes that were big in London in the early 1980s. The Clarendon was most famous for regular nights held under the name Klub Foot which attracted fans from all across the country, but also for its heavy metal nights on Sundays and for breaking newer bands in the basement "Broadway" bar.

The nearby Hammersmith Odeon and Hammersmith Palais was for more established bands, so the Clarendon competed with the nearby Red Cow (venue of AC/DC's first ever UK gig in 1976, which also hosted The Stranglers, The Damned, The Police and The Jam), George Robey and Fulham Greyhound for alternative bands.

Some bands such as Senseless Things and Flesh for Lulu were very regular performers and went on to launch successful careers. The Clarendon held a series of 13 special farewell concerts between 17 June and 30 June 1988 titled "The Final Curtain at the Klub Foot". Bands included Ghost Dance, Meteors, Doctor and the Medics and Stupids. The venue closed its doors for the last time in the early hours of 1 July 1988 and was demolished the next year.

== Masonic Temple ==
The building had a purpose-built Masonic temple which records show was used by various Masonic lodges from the 1800s. The band Madness filmed the video to "Bed and Breakfast Man" inside it in 1979.

== Legacy ==
The Clarendon is primarily remembered as a key part of the West London music scene which thrived in the post-War period until the mid 1990s.

Along with Kensington Market, it was a defining part of the youth culture of the times and played a seminal role in the indie, goth and alternative music scenes.

Its closure was initially viewed in isolation but latterly can be seen as the start of a wave of music venue closures that swept London over the next three decades.
