= IKEA of Sweden =

Swedish retail company

IKEA of Sweden AB
- IKEA Logo
- Type: Aktiebolag (AB)
- Industry: Retail (home furnishings)
- Founded: November 21, 1960; 65 years ago in Älmhult, Sweden
- Founder: Ingvar Kamprad
- Headquarters: Älmhult, Sweden
- Area served: Worldwide
- Key people: Jesper Brodin (CEO)
- Products: Design of furniture, home furnishings, kitchen appliances, lighting, textiles, carpets, decorations
- Owner: Inter IKEA Holding
- Number of employees: 2,821 (2023)
- Parent: Inter IKEA Holding
- Subsidiaries: IKEA Food Services AB; Ikea Development Center Sp. Z O.O; Inter Testing & Consulting Services Co. Ltd; Ikea Product Dev And Tech Service (Sh) Co. Ltd
- Website: www.ikea.com

IKEA of Sweden AB is a Swedish company responsible for designing, developing, and maintaining the global IKEA product range. It is a subsidiary of Inter IKEA Holding and is based in Älmhult, Sweden.

The company oversees IKEA's product assortment, including home furnishings and food, in accordance with the IKEA Concept framework. IKEA of Sweden was founded in 1960 and is one of the oldest existing corporate entities within IKEA.

== Operations ==
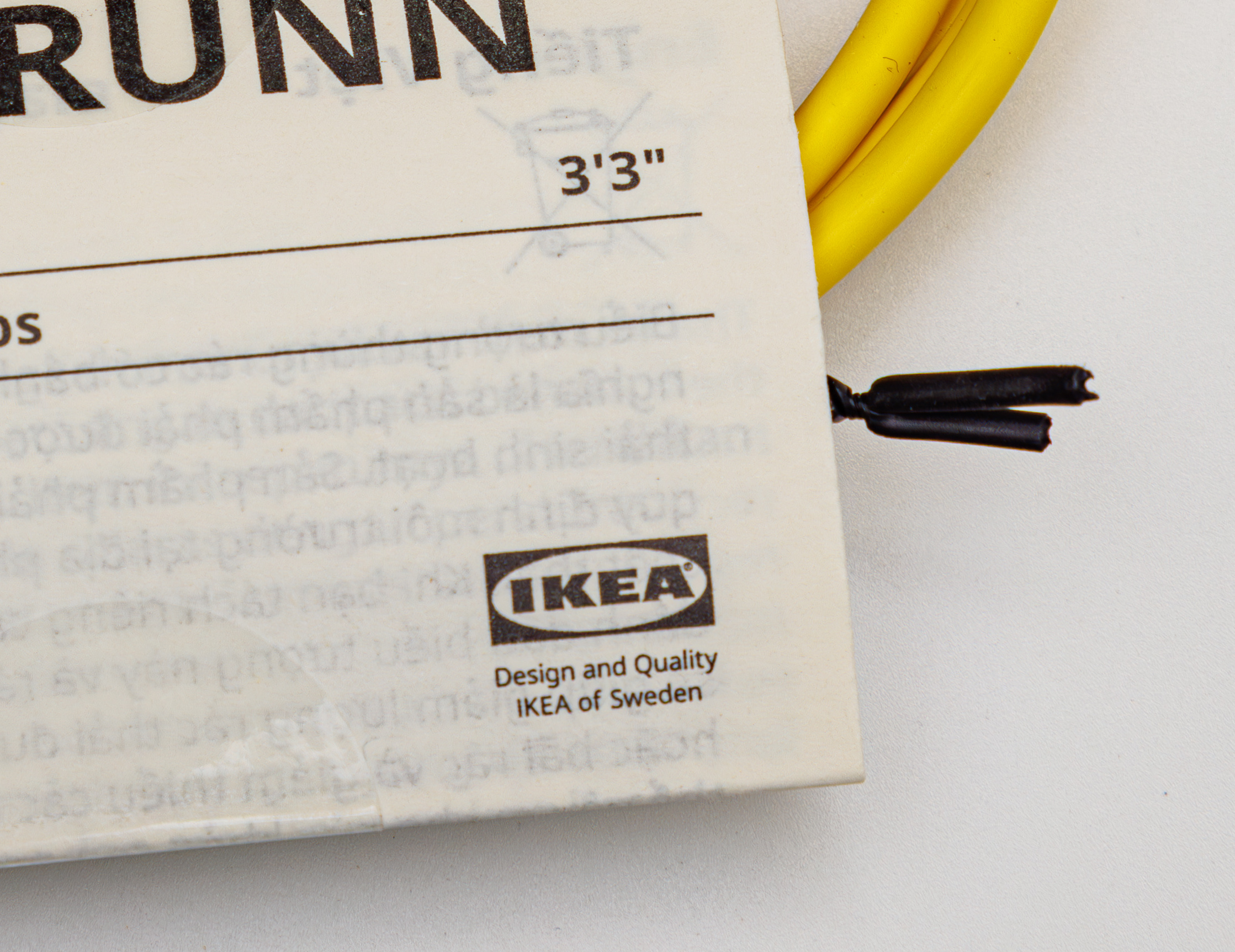
IKEA products are labelled with "IKEA of Sweden"

IKEA of Sweden is responsible for the development and maintenance of IKEA's product range. This includes furniture, home accessories, and food products. The company is part of the Range division within Inter IKEA Group and ensures product designs align with IKEA's business concept.

IKEA of Sweden oversees IKEA's global sourcing and supplier relations. Decisions regarding product range and sourcing strategies for raw materials and finished goods are centralised at IKEA of Sweden in Älmhult. The company also provides technological assistance to suppliers, particularly in China and Southeast Asia. This includes guidance on improving production processes and product quality.

=== Product Naming ===
IKEA of Sweden manages the naming process of IKEA products, following a systematic approach outlined in IKEA's naming convention. Names are selected by a dedicated team from predefined lists set by the company. The structured naming process was formally introduced in the late 1970s.

IKEA ownership chart
Flowchart showing the structure and ownership of IKEA companies. Parent companies are at the top of the chart.
Provides services to | Is the parent of | Provides funding to

== See also ==
- Inter IKEA Holding
- INGKA Holding
- Ingvar Kamprad
