= Pigpile =

1992 live album by Big Black

Live album by Big Black
- Released: October 5, 1992
- Recorded: July 24, 1987
- Venues: Clarendon Hotel Ballroom, Hammersmith, London
- Genre: Noise rock
- Length: 46:02
- Label: Touch and Go

Big Black chronology
Songs About Fucking (1987)	Pigpile (1992)

Pigpile is a live album by the American musical group Big Black. It is a recording from July 24, 1987, during the noise rock band's final European tour, released in 1992 originally as a VHS tape (it was their second video release, following the 'Live' tape on Atavistic Records). It was later issued as an audio-only LP/cassette/CD. The recordings were made at the Hammersmith Clarendon ballroom, London. A 5" transparent heavy-duty vinyl record was included away free with all copies of the VHS tape and some copies of the soundtrack album, featuring a cover version of the Mary Jane Girls song "In My House". Lower-quality recordings from the Hammersmith concert had previously appeared in a different configuration on the bootleg LP Tonight We Walked With Giants.

Pigpile coincided with the re-release of Big Black's entire catalog on Touch and Go Records. A limited edition of Pigpile was issued as a box set that included the LP and its insert, a VHS tape of the Hammersmith concert, the "In My House" one-sided 5" single, a poster and a Big Black T-shirt.

== Reception ==
Professional ratings
Review scores
Source	Rating
AllMusic	3.5/5 stars
Alternative Rock	6/10
The Encyclopedia of Popular Music	3/5 stars
The Great Alternative & Indie Discography	7/10
MusicHound	2.5/5
Rolling Stone	3.5/5 stars
Select	4/5 medals

Released five years after Big Black chose to disband at the peak of their artistic and commercial success, Pigpile received concurrent and retrospective reviews ranging from lukewarm to gushing. Writing shortly after the album's release, Spin magazine remarked that Pigpile was "a live album with sound quality unworthy of an audio nut like Albini." Looking back at Albini's career through Big Black and his subsequent band, Rapeman a decade on, Rolling Stone called Pigpile a "fun-but-not-revelatory live album," ranking it a notch below any of the group's studio albums.

== Track listing ==
All tracks are written by Big Black.

No.	Title	Length
1.	"Fists Of Love"	4:14
2.	"L Dopa"	1:49
3.	"Passing Complexion"	3:06
4.	"Dead Billy"	5:12
5.	"Cables"	3:18
6.	"Bad Penny"	3:03
7.	"Pavement Saw"	2:56
8.	"Kerosene"	6:38
9.	"Steelworker"	4:52
10.	"Pigeon Kill"	2:24
11.	"Fish Fry"	1:55
12.	"Jordan, Minnesota"	7:05
Total length:		46:32

== Album credits ==
- Big Black - Performance
- Steve Albini - Inlay Notes
- Cheryl Graham - Album Artwork
