= He's a Whore =

Song by Cheap Trick

from the album Cheap Trick
- Released: February 1977
- Recorded: 1976
- Genre: Hard rock; power pop; punk rock
- Length: 2:43
- Label: Epic
- Songwriter(s): Rick Nielsen
- Producer(s): Jack Douglas

"He's a Whore" is a song written by Rick Nielsen that was first released on Cheap Trick's 1977 debut album Cheap Trick. It has also appeared on a number of Cheap Trick compilation albums, including The Essential Cheap Trick. It has also been covered by many artists including Big Black, Neon, Hanoi Rocks and Vince Neil. Like many of Cheap Trick's songs, it was played in early midwest concerts starting in 1975.

"He's a Whore" never became a live staple for Cheap Trick, although they began to play the song in concert occasionally in the 1990s and 2000s.

== Lyrics ==
The genesis of the song came from Nielsen coming up with the title and liking the idea and building the song around it. He liked the fact that the phrase "he's a whore" is not as obvious as if the title was "She's a Whore," and that a song about a gigolo involves a sense of role reversal. The lyrics imply that the narrator is involved with an unattractive but wealthy woman, with lyrics claiming "She's got a face that would stop a clock" but "her money's green." However, according to Nielsen, the song is not simply about sex. Nielsen has stated that "Whoring means so many different things, it doesn’t just mean having sex, but someone who does anything for money." Nielsen further noted that the song encompasses radio stations and people who would do anything for money, and indeed the lyrics include the line "I'm a Whore, I'll do anything for money," and this is further emphasized when lead singer Robin Zander sings "I'm a Whore" and Nielsen sings as a reply "He'll do anything for money."

== Critical reception ==
Allmusic critic Greg Prato described the song as one of the "more straightforward compositions, both lyrically and musically" on Cheap Trick's debut album and as one of the band's "most punk-based and energetic" songs. The song begins with Nielsen playing a descending, single note pattern on his guitar, while Tom Petersson plays a similar pattern on bass. Author Mike Hayes describes the opening as "aggressive, amphetamine-charged chords." Critic Robert Christgau praised the song's hook on the phrase "any time at all." Classic Rock History critic Michael Quinn rated it Cheap Trick's 7th best song, saying that "[Drummer] Bun E [Carlos] rules and his interplay with Peterson and Nielsen on this song shows you why." Nielsen's lead guitar licks propel the song along.

== Music video ==
Cheap Trick filmed a promotional video of the song, directed by Chuck Lashon, in which the band performed the song while mugging for the cameras.
