= St Martins Property Group =

Property company of the United Kingdom

St Martins Property Investments Limited
- Company type: Property
- Industry: Property
- Founded: 1924; 102 years ago
- Headquarters: London
- Products: Office space
- Owner: Future Generations Fund
- Parent: St Martins Holdings Corporation Limited
- Website: www.stmartinsproperty.com

St Martins Property Investments Limited (trading as St Martins Property Group) is a property development, investment and asset management company based in the United Kingdom representing the real estate interests of the State of Kuwait with their headquarters in London Bridge City, London. The company is wholly owned by the Kuwait sovereign wealth fund, Future Generations Fund.

Their flagship development projects are London Bridge City, an office area, and 150 Cheapside. St Martins Property Group has operations in the United Kingdom, Continental Europe including Turkey, Japan and Australia.

== History ==
=== Early history ===
The Company was incorporated in February 1924 as The St Martins-Le-Grand Property Company Limited to carry on the business of property investment. In addition to growth by acquisition, the company embarked on an extensive programme of property development and during the 1960s and 70's many schemes were completed including Kings Mall Shopping Centre at Hammersmith, which was later sold in 2011.

In 1974 Kuwait purchased the St Martin's Property Corporation outright. During the 1980s the company expanded its portfolio with the completion of major office, retail and warehousing schemes including the Drummond Centre in Croydon.

=== 21st century ===
In March 2007 St Martins completed the purchase of one of Europe's largest shopping centres, Cevahir Mall, in Istanbul. St Martins acquired a new-build office building at 51 Lime Street in the City of London in June 2008. This building was later renamed the Willis Building as it is the UK headquarters of insurers The Willis Group. Designed by architect Norman Foster, the Willis Building is located in the centre of the City opposite the Lloyd's building. St Martins then purchased the 27-storey luxury residential tower Lietocourt Arx Tower in Minato, Chuo-Ku, adjacent to Nihonbashi and Ginza, Tokyo's business and retail district. This 281-apartment building in Japan was acquired in February 2009.

=== Restructuring ===
St Martins went through a restructuring of its portfolio in 2010 and 2011 when smaller assets were sold off in the UK and in Continental Europe, plus retail shopping centres in the UK. Savills ran the portfolio sales under the code name 'Project Blue'. Subsequently, money was re-invested in core property acquisitions and the company remained in an acquisitive mode. In December 2011, 60 Threadneedle Street was acquired from Hammerson. The building completed in 2009.

Properties acquired included 1 Bunhill Row, which was bought in February 2012. The property at 5 Cheapside, by the entrance to St Paul's underground station and located next to One New Change, was sold off to Lord Sugar's property company Amsprop in 2012 for £20m. In December 2013, St Martins Property Group bought the 13-acre More London (London Bridge City) estate for around £1.7bn. In January 2014, the More London Estate, a 13-acre complex of 11 buildings, adjacent to London Bridge City, was acquired in one of the UK's largest-ever transactions.

== Current operations ==
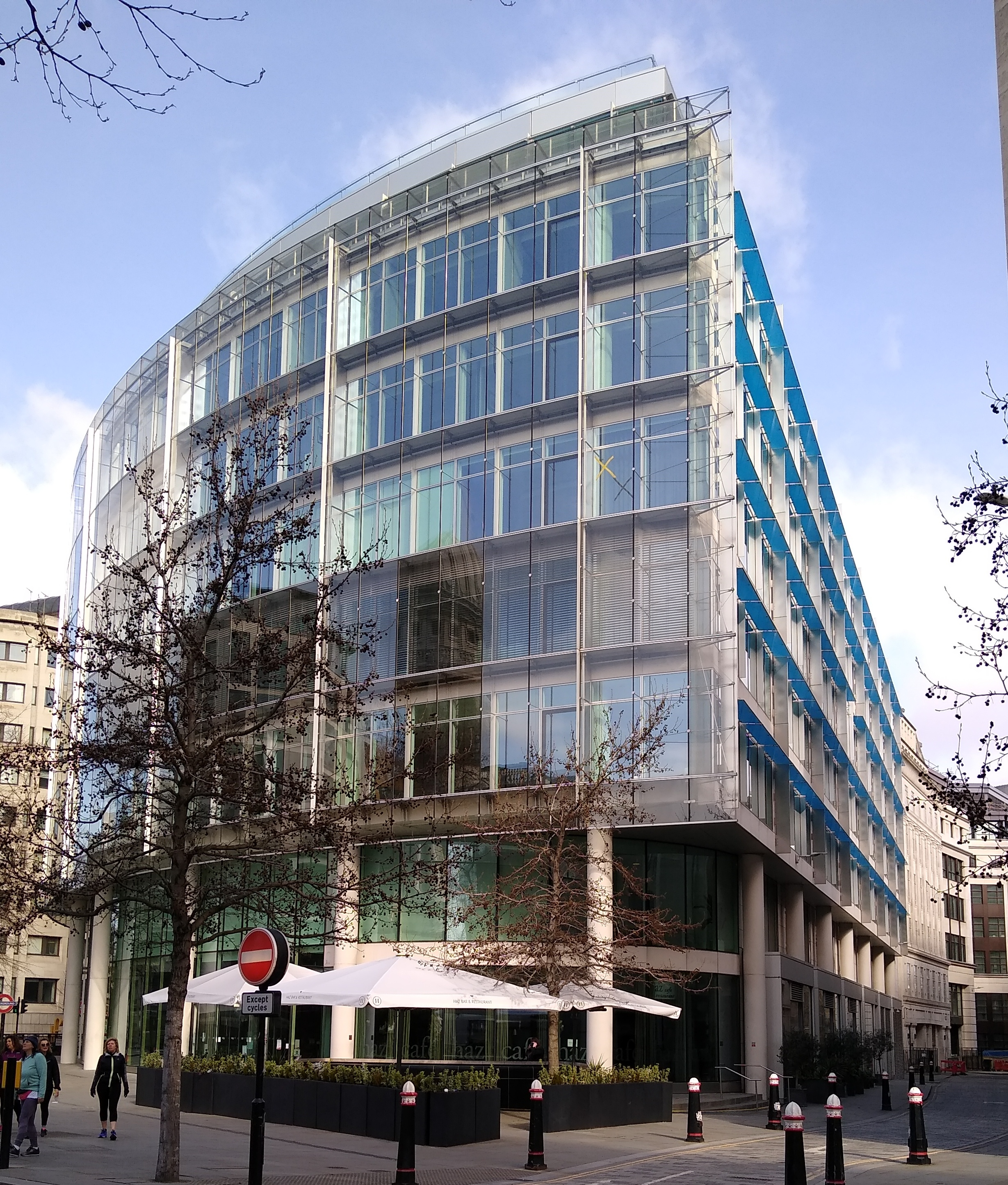
150 Cheapside

The property at 5 Canada Square is let to Credit Suisse, which sublets 10 floors to the Bank of America.

== See also ==
- Government of Kuwait
