= INGKA Centres =

Dutch commercial real estate developer and operator

INGKA Centres Holding B.V.
- Type: Real estate developer
- Industry: Retail
- Founded: 1973; 53 years ago
- Founder: Ingvar Kamprad
- Headquarters: Netherlands
- Area served: Worldwide
- Key people: CEO – Juvencio Maeztu
- Parent: INGKA Holding
- Website: www.ingkacentres.com

INGKA Centres Holding B.V. (formerly known as IKEA Centres and IKANO Retail Centres) is a Dutch commercial real estate developer and operator owned by INGKA Holding.

INGKA Centres is one of the biggest shopping centre companies, owning, managing and operating 37 'meeting places' across Asia, Europe and the Americas.

== History ==
The company was founded in 1972, when a shopping centre named Birsta City was built next to an IKEA store in Sundsvall, Sweden which opened a few years prior in 1969.

In 2002 and 2014 respectively, the IKEA Group began opening shopping centres in Russia and China under the MEGA and Livat brands respectively.

In 2015, Ikano sold its 51% stake of the company to the IKEA Group, IKANO Retail Centres, alongside the Livat and MEGA centres, were unified under the IKEA Centres group.

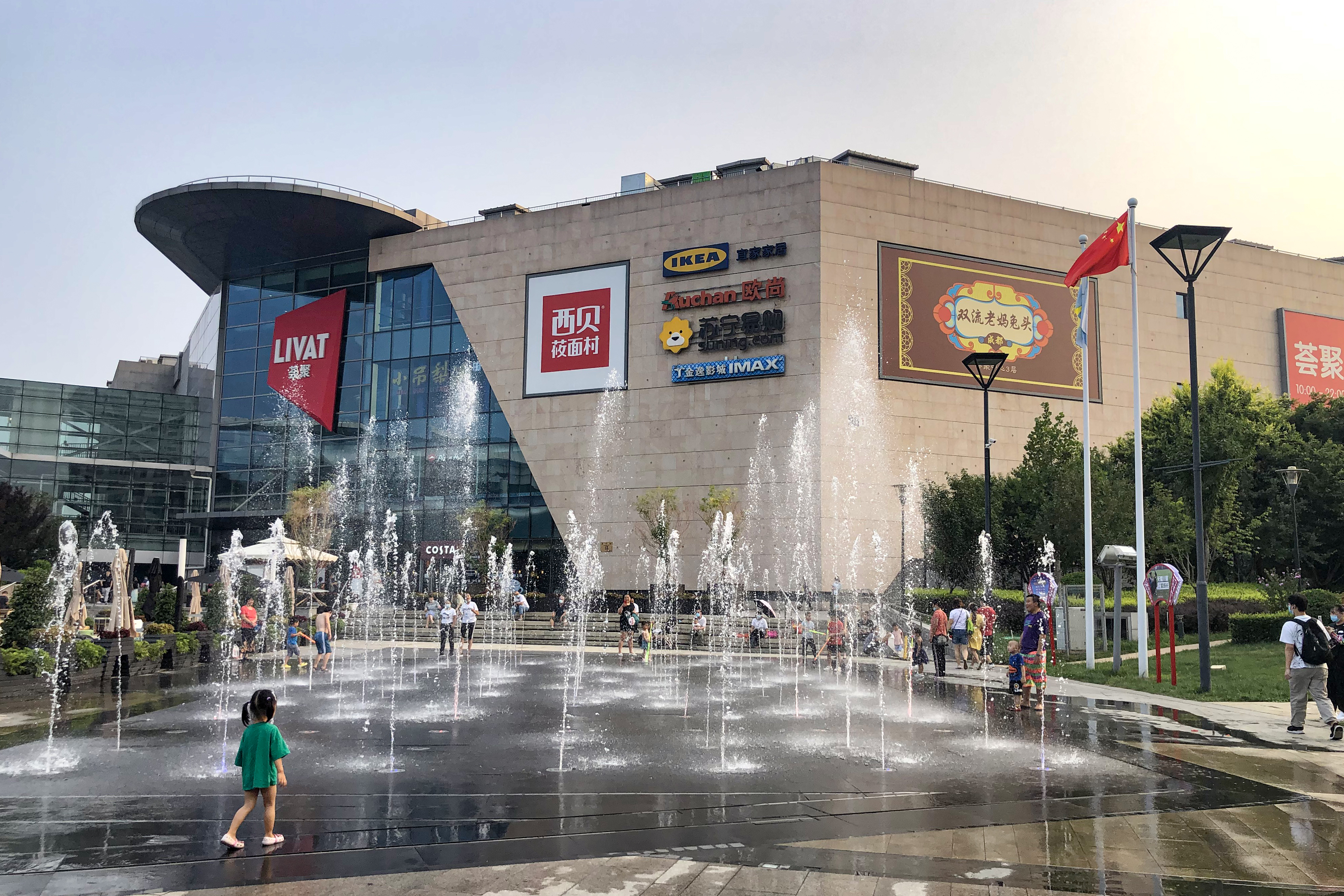
Photo of Livat Beijing with older branding.

In 2018, the company was rebranded from IKEA Centres to INGKA Centres, as part of its parent company's rebranding to its legal name of INGKA Group.

Originally, the company built and developed its own shopping centres, this changed in 2020 when they acquired a building in San Francisco and the Kings Mall in Hammersmith, the latter was rebranded under the Livat brand, making this the first centre outside of China to adopt the name. Both acquired properties became home to a concept IKEA store called IKEA City.

INGKA Centres announced in December 2021 that it would open two malls, anchored by IKEA stores, in Gurugram and Noida in India at a cost of around ₹9,000 crore (US$960 million). Both malls are expected to open by 2025.

Following the invasion of Ukraine, INGKA Centres halted retail operations in Russia and in September 2023 sold all of its MEGA Centres to Gazprombank Group.

In 2026, INGKA Centres made a deal with GoHigh Capital to sell some of its interest in its Livat centres in China, INGKA Centres would still co-own and manage the centres.

In March 2026, INGKA Centres announced that they would unify their shopping centres in Sweden under the Livli brand, these shopping centres include Birsta City, Erikslund Shopping Center and i-HUSET.

In June 2026, INGKA Centres were actively looking for shopping centres to acquire in the United Kingdom, this follows a failed bid for the Merry Hill Shopping Centre, which was ultimately sold to Redical.

== List of locations ==
INGKA Centres owns, manages and operates 38 shopping centres (or self-described 'meeting places'), all of them have IKEA as an anchor tenant.

=== Asia ===
Centre	Location	Shops	Opened/Acquired	Owner
Livat Beijing	Daxing, Beijing, China	455	2015	INGKA Centres and GoHigh Capital
Livat Changsha	Changsha, Hunan, China	380	2021	INGKA Centres
Livat Fuzhou	Fuzhou, Fujian, China	62	2021	INGKA Centres
Livat Hefei	Hefei, Anhui, China	60	2023	INGKA Centres
Livat Kunming	Kunming, Yunnan, China	62	2022	INGKA Centres
Livat Nanning	Nanning, Guangxi, China	80	2021	INGKA Centres
Livat Shanghai	Changning, Shanghai, China	300	2024	INGKA Centres
Livat Wuhan	Wuhan, Hubei, China	356	2015	INGKA Centres and GoHigh Capital
Livat Wuxi	Wuxi, Jiangsu, China	318	2014	INGKA Centres and GoHigh Capital
Livat Xi'an	Xi'an, Shaanxi, China	450	2024	INGKA Centres
Lykli Gurugram	Gurugram, India	253	2025	INGKA Centres

=== Europe ===
Centre	Location	Shops	Opened/Acquired	Owner
Designer Outlet Croatia	Zagreb, Croatia	74	2018	INGKA Centres, ROS Retail Outlet Shopping and Mutschler Outlet Holding
Avion Shopping Park Ostrava	Ostrava, Czech Republic	178	2001	INGKA Centres
Matkus Shopping Center	Kuopio, Finland	72	2012	INGKA Centres
Ametzondo Shopping	Biarritz, France	110	2016	INGKA Centres
Italie 2	Paris, France	114	1990 (acquired 2023)	INGKA Centres
Pasing Arcaden	Munich, Germany	140	2011 (acquired 2024)	INGKA Centres
ELNÒS Shopping	Roncadelle, Italy	145	2016	INGKA Centres
Tiare Shopping	Villesse, Italy	146	2013	INGKA Centres
Aleja Bielany	Bielany Wrocławskie, Poland	200	1998	INGKA Centres
Port Łódź	Łódź, Poland	198	2010	INGKA Centres
SKENDE Shopping	Lublin, Poland	67	2017	INGKA Centres
Wola Park	Wola, Poland	200	2002	INGKA Centres
MAR Shopping Algarve	Algarve, Portugal	180	2017	INGKA Centres
MAR Shopping Matosinhos	Matosinhos, Portugal	110	2008	INGKA Centres
Avion Shopping Park Ružinov	Ružinov, Slovakia	180	2002	INGKA Centres
LUZ Shopping	Cádiz, Spain	67	2010	INGKA Centres
RÍO Shopping	Valladolid. Spain	135	2012	INGKA Centres
Älmhults Handelsplats	Älmhult, Sweden	19	2013	INGKA Centres
Livli Sundsvall	Sundsvall, Sweden	100	1967	INGKA Centres
Livli Västerås	Västerås, Sweden	83	2001	INGKA Centres
Livli Linköping	Linköping, Sweden	70	1994	INGKA Centres
Livli Kungens Kurva	Stockholm, Sweden	28	2014	INGKA Centres
Shopping Park Kållered	Kållered, Sweden	20	1986	INGKA Centres
Churchill Square	Brighton, England, United Kingdom	82	1998 (acquired 2023)	INGKA Centres
Livat Hammersmith	Hammersmith, England, United Kingdom	33	1979 (acquired 2020)	INGKA Centres

=== The Americas ===
Centre	Location	Shops	Opened/Acquired	Owner
Aura	Toronto, Ontario, Canada	1	2014 (acquired 2021) (Note: Retail podium, floors 1-3)	INGKA Centres
945 Market	San Francisco, California, United States	12	2024	INGKA Centres
