= Erikslund Shopping Center =

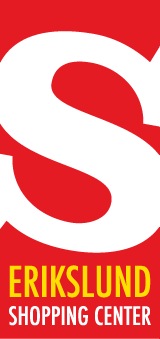
- Location: Västerås, Sweden
- Coordinates: 59°36′32.9″N 16°27′16.9″E
- Opened: 2011
- Owner: INGKA Centres
- Num. of stores: 80
- Num. of anchor tenants: 2
- Floor area: 80,000 m^{2} (860,000 sq ft)
- Floors: 2
- Parking: 3,500
- Public transit: Line 3, Västmanlands Lokaltrafik bus service
- Website: erikslundshoppingcenter.se

Erikslund Shopping Center is a shopping center located next to highway E18 in Västerås, Sweden. It opened in 2011 and was established by Ikano Retail Centres and currently owned by INGKA Centres, with two anchor tenants on each end of the mall, IKEA and a City Gross supermarket. The shopping center has 80 stores and a total retail floor area of 80,000 m^{2} (860,000 sq ft), with IKEA occupying almost half of the floor space.

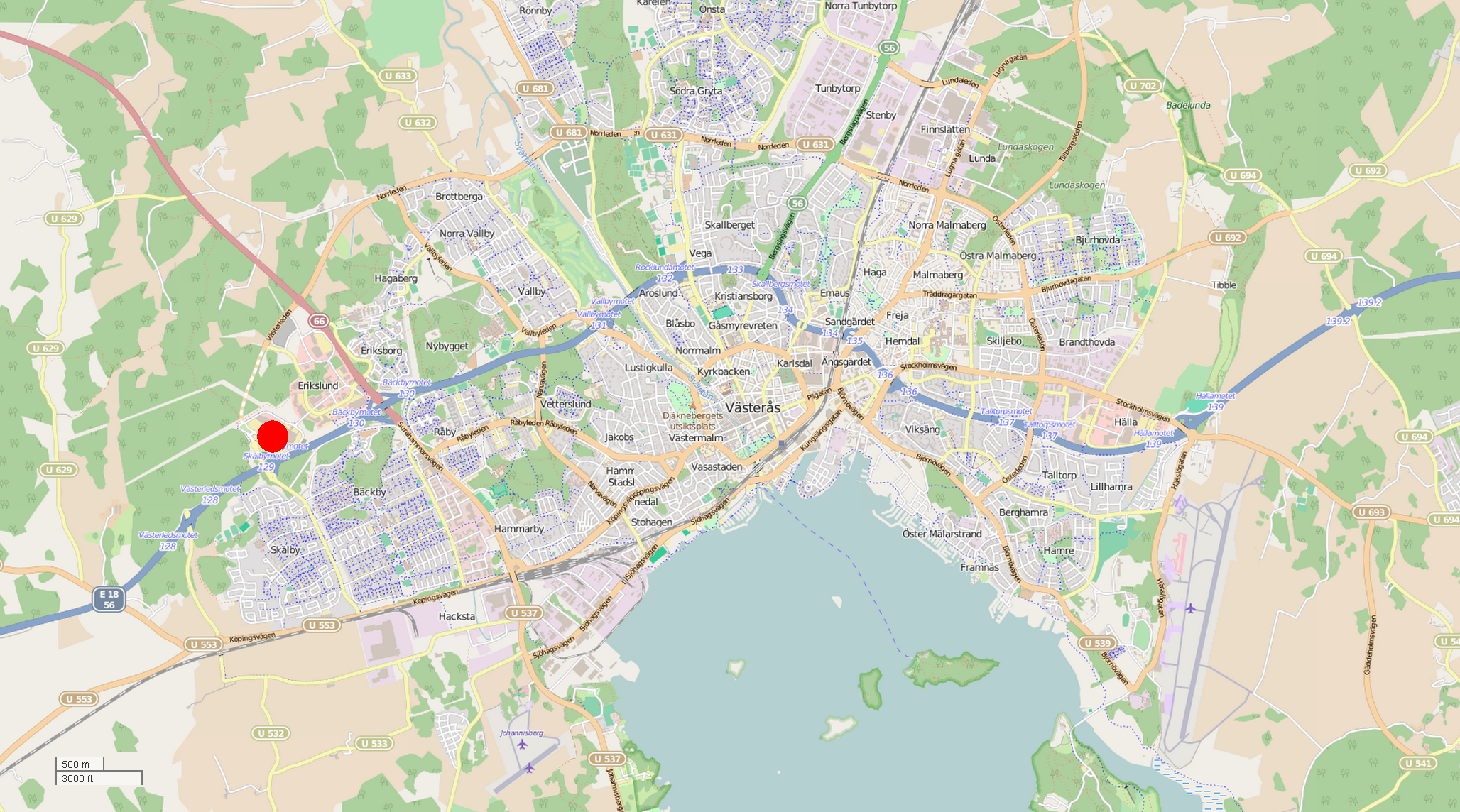
Location within Västerås

The complex is part of the Erikslund retail park, consisting of several big-box stores, with a total retail floor area of approximately 200,000 m^{2} (2,200,000 sq ft). The retail park is the third biggest in Sweden, after Kungens Kurva and Barkarby in terms of sales, according to the Nordic Council of Shopping Centers.

== See also ==
- List of shopping centres in Sweden
