= Aura (Toronto) =

Skyscraper in Toronto, Canada

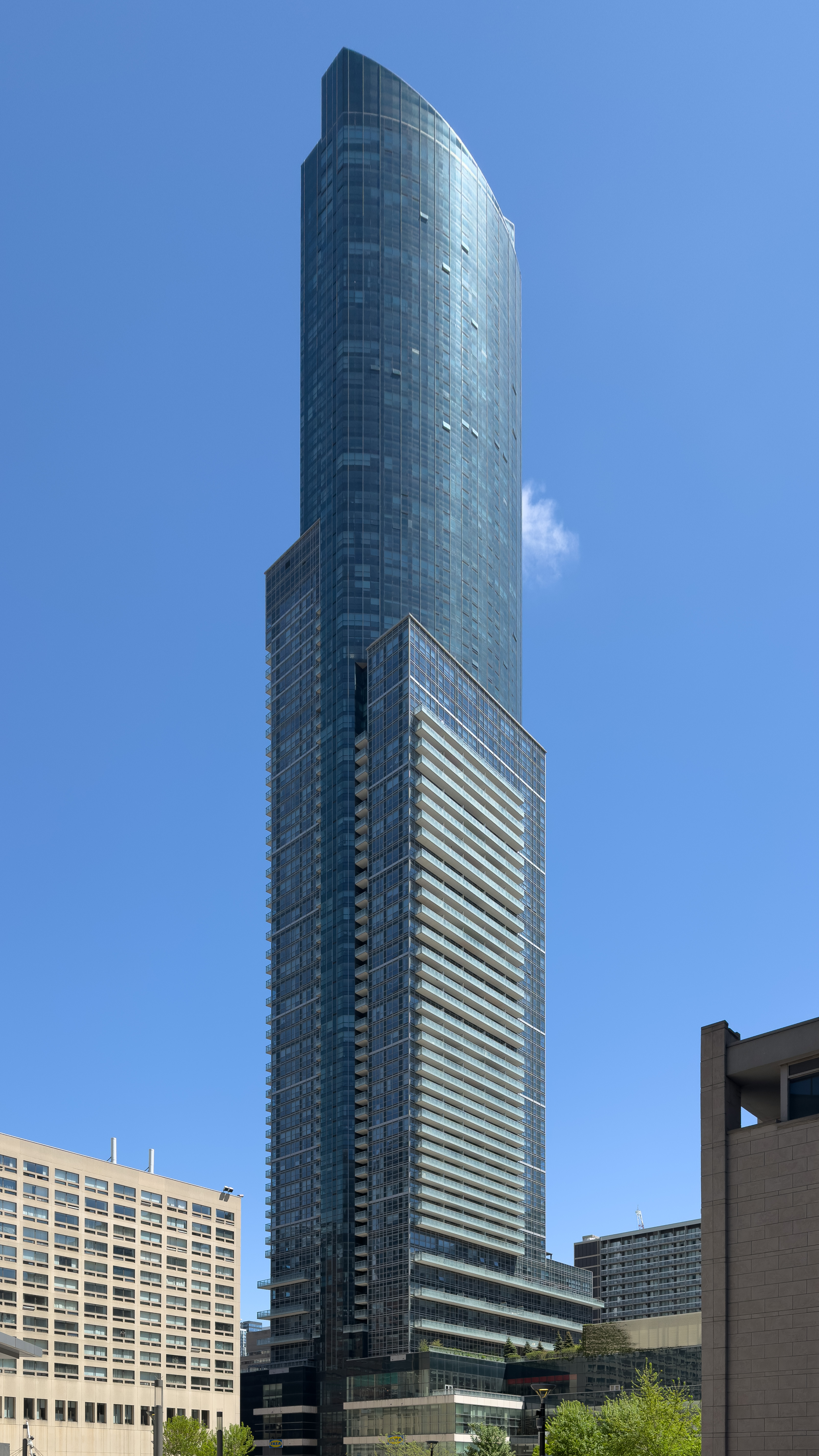
- Aura in 2025
- Interactive map of the Aura area

General information
- Status: Completed
- Type: Residential and retail
- Location: 386 & 388 Yonge Street (at Gerrard Street); Toronto, Ontario
- Coordinates: 43.65942°N 79.382787°W
- Construction started: January 2010
- Completed: Summer 2014
- Opened: Fall 2014
- Owner: INGKA Centres (retail podium, floors 1-3); Various residential owners via TSCC 2421 (386 Yonge) and TSCC 2446 (388 Yonge)

Height
- Antenna spire: 272 m (892 ft)

Technical details
- Floor count: 79
- Floor area: 123,732 square metres (1,331,840 sq ft)

Design and construction
- Architect: Graziani + Corazza
- Developer: Canderel Stoneridge Equity Group Inc.
- Main contractor: Reliance Construction Management

Aura is a mixed-use skyscraper completed in 2014 in Toronto, Ontario, Canada. It is the final phase of a series of condominium buildings near College Park in Toronto's Downtown Yonge district. It is part of the Residences of College Park project. Construction lasted from 2010 to 2014. With 80 floors, as of 2018 it is the tallest residential building in Canada and the 38th tallest residential building in the world.

== History ==
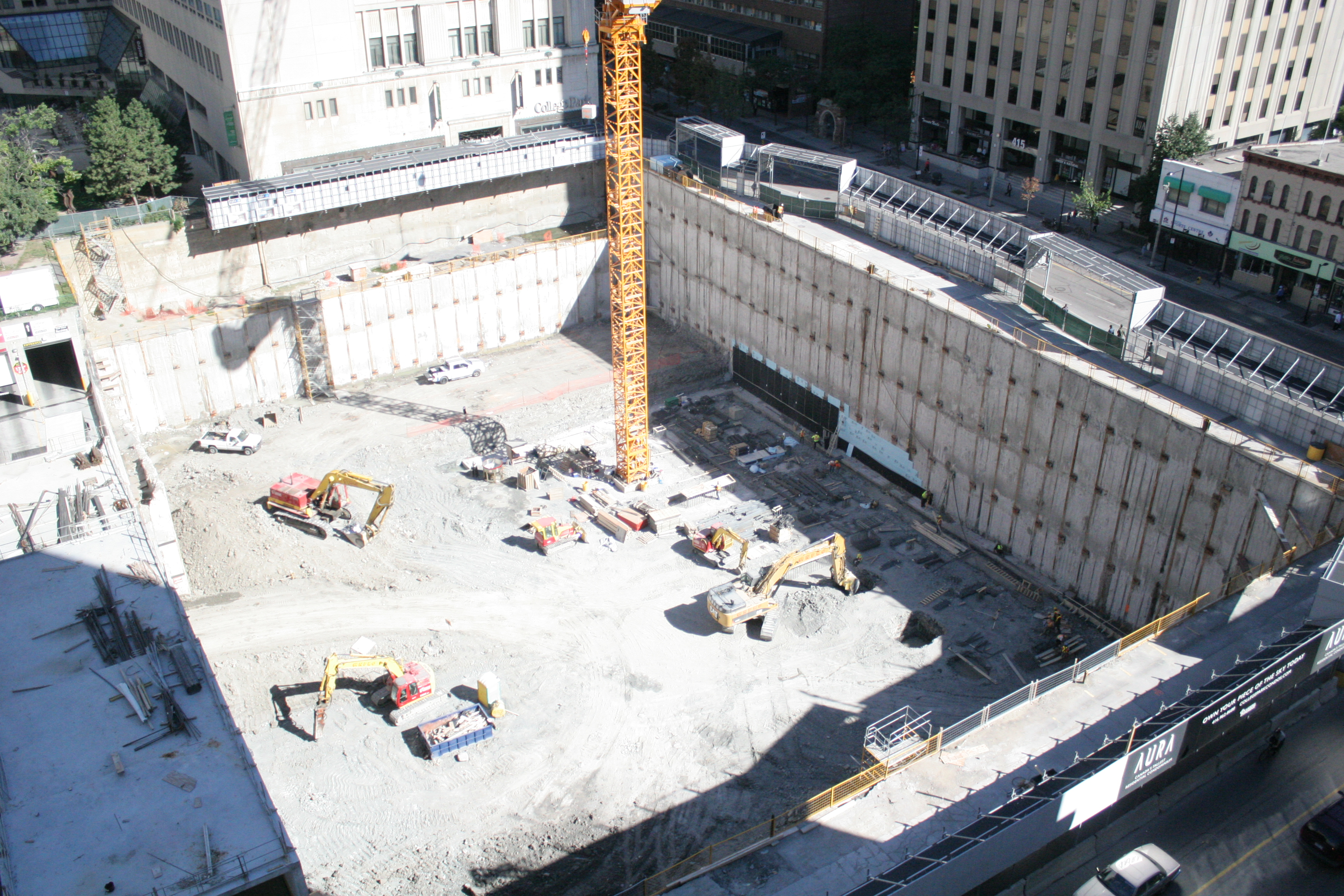
The excavated site in September 2010

The original design proposed two towers. The building would have featured a ten-storey podium, with two towers on top. The taller tower would have been (including podium) 60 storeys and 196.5 m tall. The shorter tower (including podium) would have been 20 storeys and 74.5 m tall. In February 2012, Toronto city council approved a three-storey increase to 78 floors, meaning that Aura is Canada's tallest residential building.

The lower floors of the building were occupied while the upper floors were still being constructed. Floors 1-31 were opened for occupancy in the fall of 2013, while floors 32-80 were still bare concrete. The second set of floors, 32 to 57, were occupied in the spring of 2014. The final phase, floors 58-80, were expected to be completed in December 2014.

On August 2, 2016, several residents - including members of the condo board - went public to describe the unreliable condition of the elevators. At this time only one elevator served all floors above the 50th. Many residents on the upper floors were not able to rely on the elevators to exit the building, and believed that design flaws did not account for passenger demand. Property management blamed flooding for the outages.

On January 25, 2020, the residents of the Aura condominium were notified that all water would be shut off for seven weeks. Cold water was restored the next day. Property management blamed the city's water main and requested residents to find "alternative accommodations". It was later demonstrated that several pumps had failed inside the building.

In March 2021, INGKA Centres, the real estate division of IKEA lead franchisee INGKA Holding, announced it had taken ownership of the podium (excluding the basement-level retail condominium units) and would be converting much of the space to an urban-format IKEA store, the first permanent store of its kind in Canada. Shortly before the sale announcement, a Bed Bath & Beyond location on the second level as well as three large restaurants on the main level had announced they would be closing permanently. The IKEA store opened on May 25, 2022.

The fourth floor, which previously housed a gym (originally Hard Candy Fitness and later Crunch Fitness), was listed for sale or lease by Aura's condo boards in early 2021.

== Architecture ==
The semi-transparent metal and high-tempered brick 78-storey tower has approximately 100,000 m^{2} (1.1 million sq.ft.) of residential space. This makes Aura Canada's tallest and largest residential building. The residential portion of the tower is built above a three-storey podium which has approximately 14,000 m^{2} (150,000 sq.ft.) of retail space.

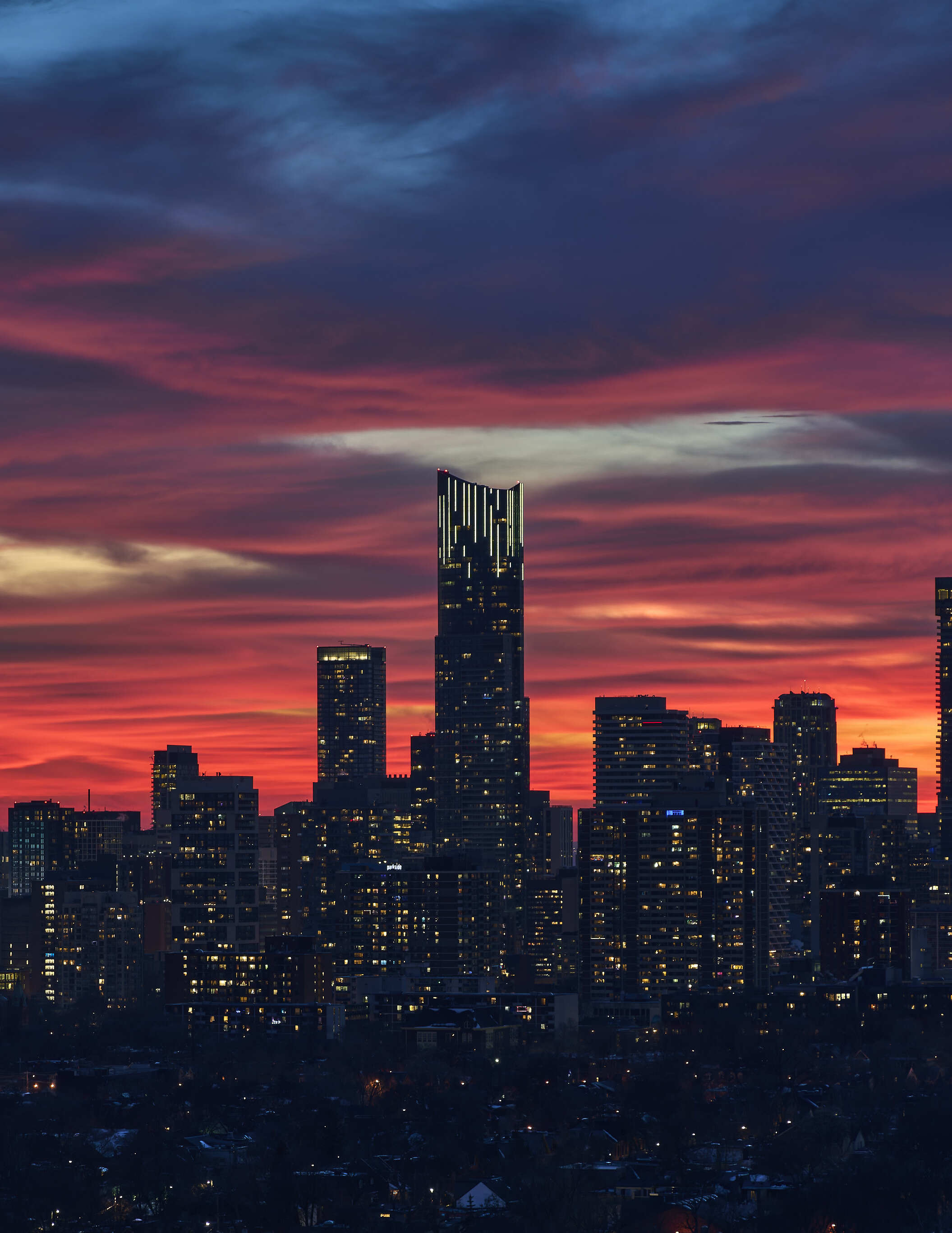
Aura at night

The building features lighting installed on the top floors, visible across most of the city. This lighting, although discussed with city planners, was unexpectedly bright when installed. This resulted in a deadly impact on migratory birds. The city later negotiated with the developers to turn off the lights after 10:30PM during the fall migration season.

== Facilities and amenities ==
The building is connected by tunnel to adjacent College Park complex, which contains the College subway station. The building has a shared patio on the 5th floor and a 40,000 square-foot fitness facility. There is a fast food court in the basement level of the building with space for 12 vendors. In 2015, the popular Toronto-based website BlogTO described Shops at Aura as "Toronto's Worst Mall". This was largely in reaction to the half-vacant retail space, limited offerings at the food court, and atmosphere. As of 2016, only three of the 12 fast food units were occupied.

As of 2016, only 50 of the 250 retail units were occupied. As of August 2021, only 45 units were occupied.

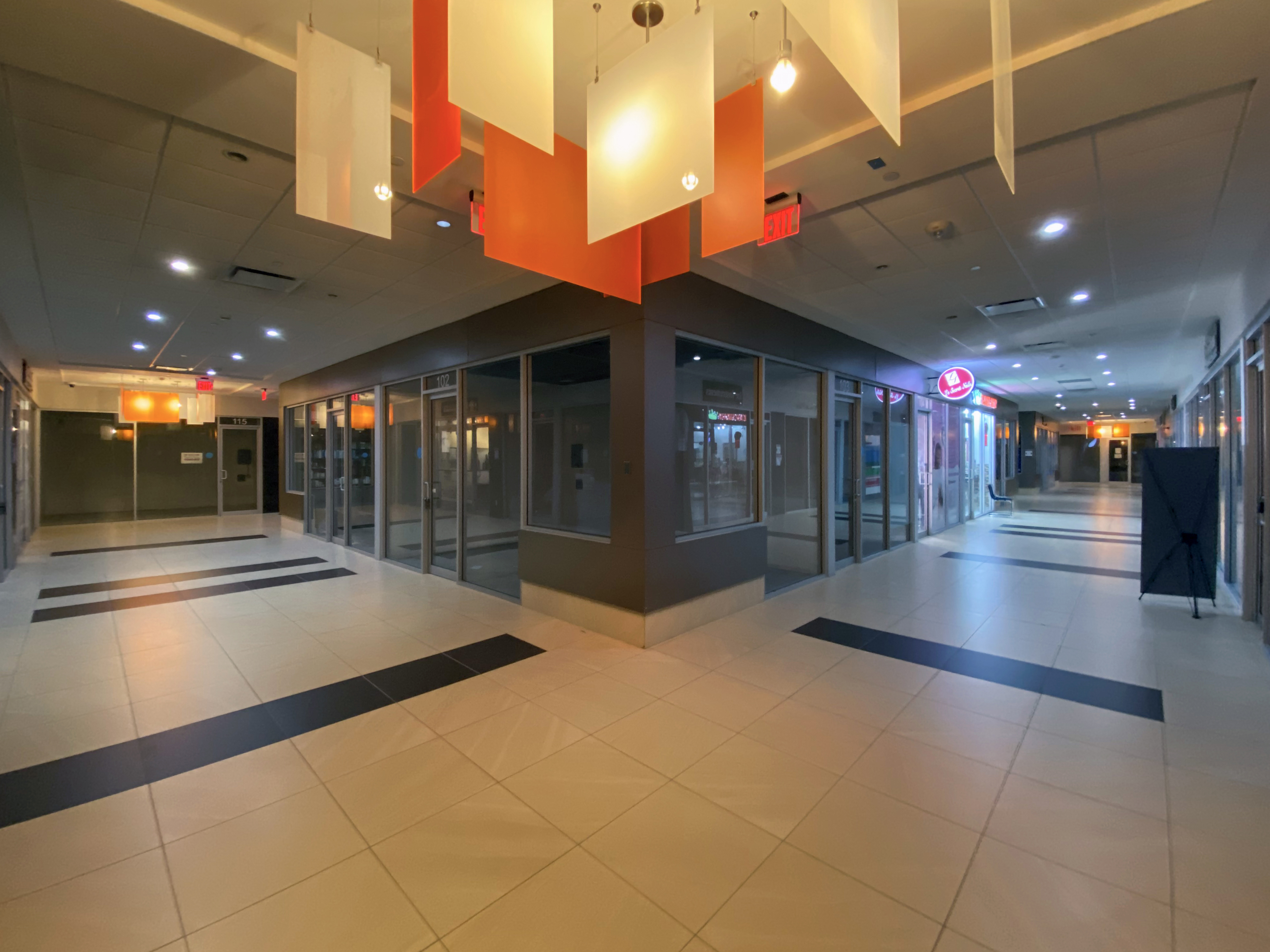
Basement Arcade has many vacant shops.

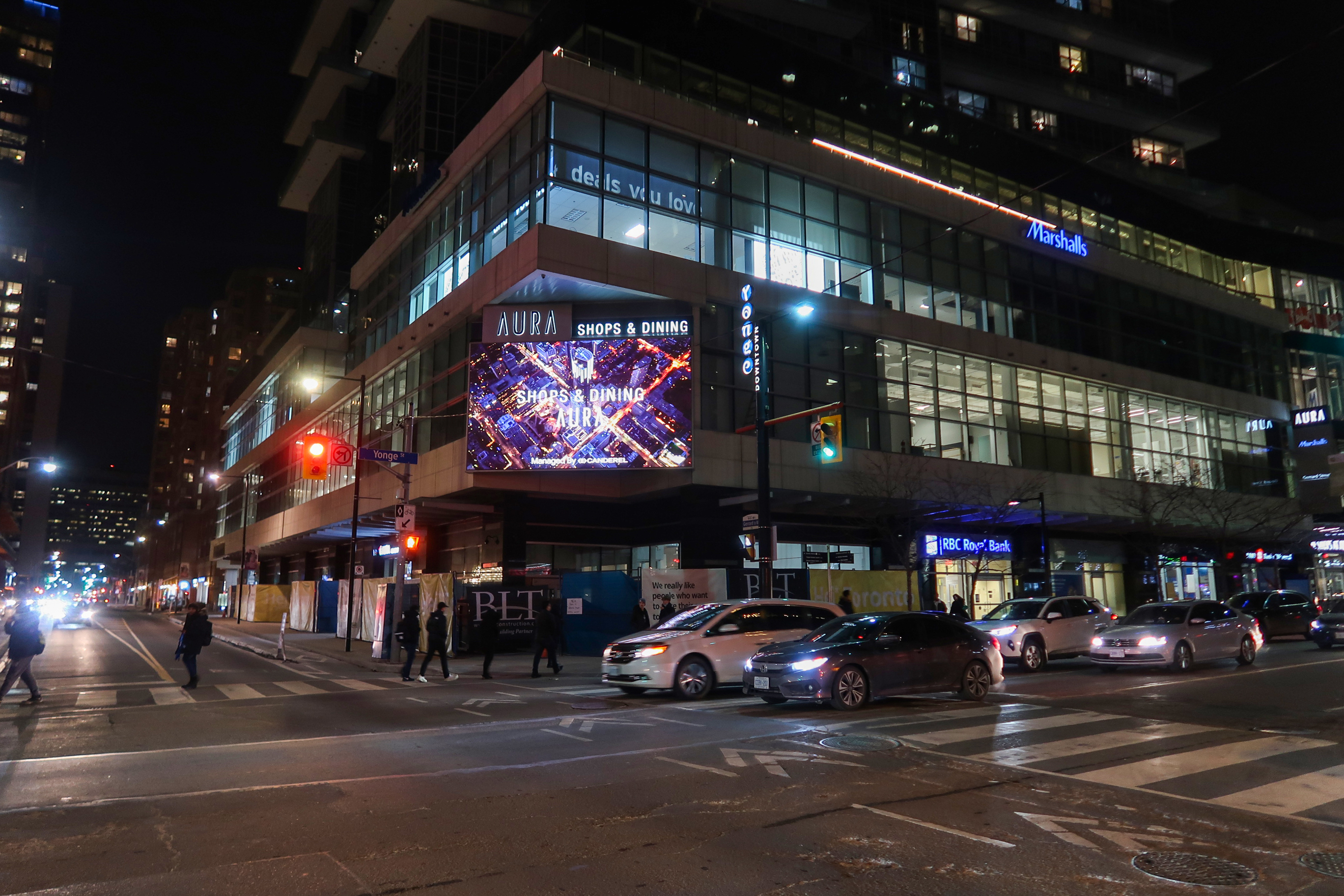
Facade of the mall

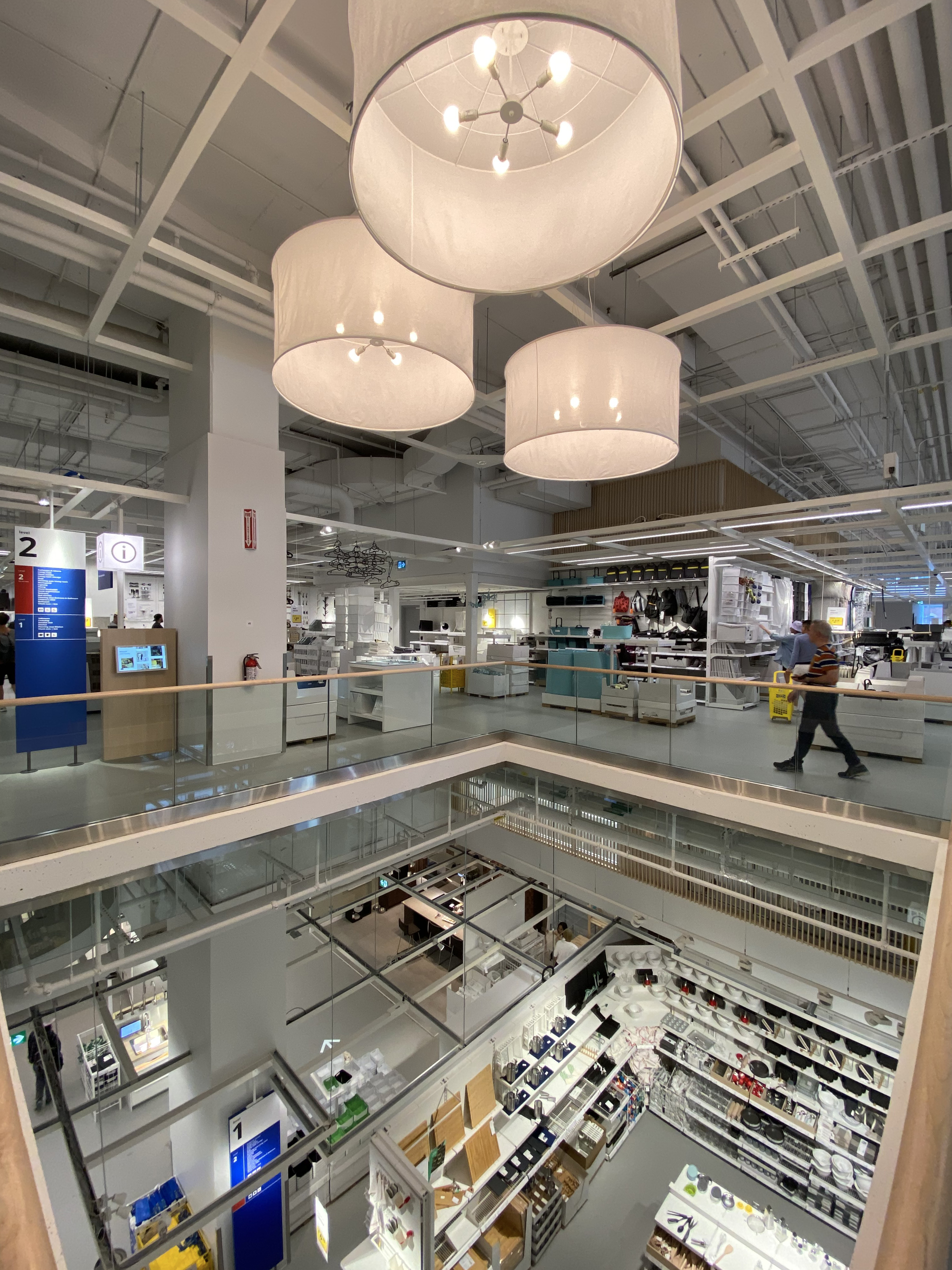
In May, 2022, the downtown first IKEA open at the Level 1 and Level 2 of the mall

== See also ==
- List of tallest buildings in Toronto
- List of tallest buildings in Canada
