= Cibes Lift =

Elevator manufacturer

Cibes Lift AB
- Company type: Private
- Industry: Industrials, Elevators
- Founded: 1947
- Founder: Bertil Svedberg
- Headquarters: Gävle, Sweden
- Area served: Worldwide
- Key people: Martin Lewerth, CEO
- Revenue: 3 663 MSEK (2025)
- Number of employees: 2000 (2026)
- Parent: Cibes Holding AB
- Website: https://www.cibeslift.com

Cibes Lift is a Swedish manufacturer of low speed, screw-driven platform lifts and cabin lifts for installation in public and private environments. Owned by the Cibes Lift Group, Cibes Lift is headquartered in the Swedish city of Gävle. Today, Cibes Lift is one of the largest manufacturers of space-saving, ready-made low-speed lifts and Cibes Lift Group has sales and distribution in about 70 countries across the world.

== History ==
The story of Cibes Lift began when MSc Bertil Svedberg founded the company Elektroborg AB and created the Cibes brand in 1947. During the 1950s, he started manufacturing chain-driven hoists with lift car for rated loads between 200 and 1000 kg in Solna (Sweden). At the beginning, manufacturing amounted to approx. 30 lifts / year, still under the brand name Elektroborg.

In the mid-1960s, Elektroborg started a collaboration with Stenfors Industries, a company that contract manufactured a lift solution, intended for disabled users and consisting of a lift table with guardrails. Elektroborg handled the sales activities of the contract manufactured lift during the 1970s and also contributed with product development that made the lift more wheelchair-friendly. The product development conducted by Elektroborg also resulted in a design where the lift car was driven by a screw rod, built on a tripod with legs. This wheelchair-friendly lift had inbuilt safety features as early as the late 1970s and became a recommended product with the Swedish Work Environment Authority. The first modern screw-driven lift was born.

Thanks to the Swedish social reforms and legislation to improve the integration of disabled people into society, the Elektroborg lift sales continued to increase throughout the 1980s. In 1986, the company started developing and manufacturing platform lifts in Järbo, Sweden. Export sales began, just a few years later, in 1989, starting with the Nordic countries, such as Finland and Norway. Then in 1991, Cibes Elevator AB (now Cibes Lift AB) was created and in the following year, the company moved to new premises to meet the increasing demand of the market. In 1995, when Sweden joined the European Union (EU) and the platform lift Cibes A5000 was certified for the European market, the Cibes export sales in Europe started to accelerate. In 1999, Cibes Lift joined forces with 24 other lift manufacturers to found the European Platform and Stairlift Association (EPSA), created to harmonise rules and regulations related to platform lifts and stairlifts in the European Union and Great Britain in cooperation with relevant authorities. In 2008, the extraordinary growth journey of Cibes Lift was awarded with the Hermes Export Prize by the Swedish Chamber of Commerce and the Swedish Fund for Export Development.

In 2012, Cibes Lift's production facilities and the headquarters Of Cibes Lift Group moved to Gävle and in 2020 a second production unit and R&D centre were established in Jiaxing, China, to cater to the needs of the Asian markets. In 2022, Cibes Lift Group also acquired production facilities in the USA.

In 2024, a production unit was founded in Gdansk, Poland, to manufacture and supply key components and packaging details for the production units in Sweden and the USA.
