= Hiltulanlahti =

City district in Kuopio, Finland

Coordinates: 62°48′28″N 27°36′39″E

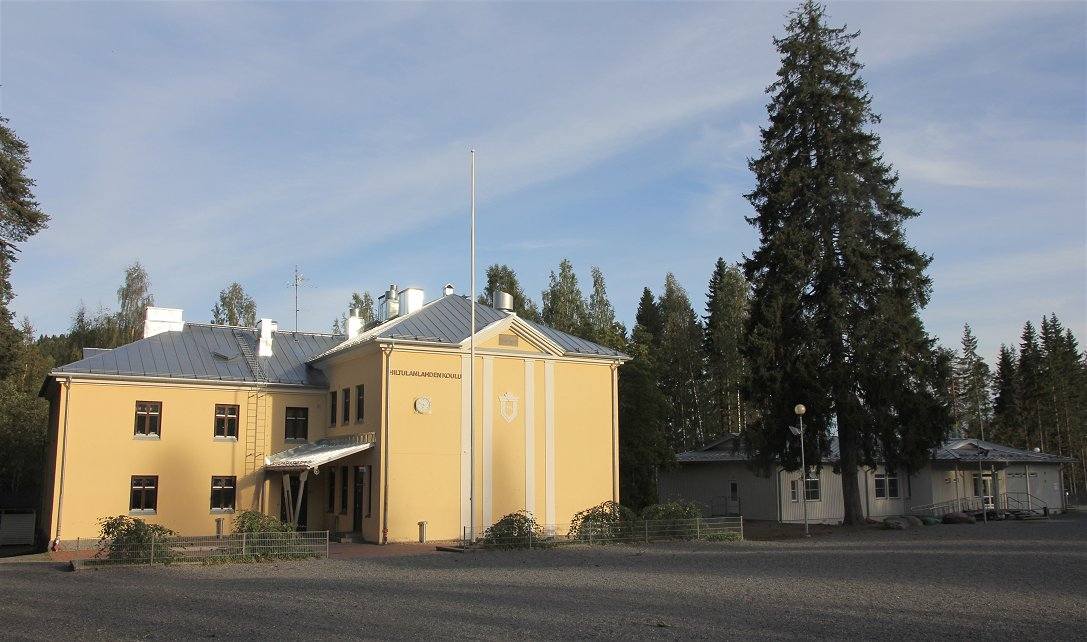
Hiltulanlahti School

Hiltulanlahti is a rural village and urban area in the southern part of Kuopio, Finland, right next to the European route E63. At the end of 2011, the area had 242 inhabitants.

Hiltulanlahti is located about 15 kilometers south of the center of Kuopio along the old Highway 5, or regional road 553. Almost the entire housing stock in Hiltulanlahti consists of detached houses. Construction of the area has been under way for several decades and the process continues. The population of Hiltulanlahti is constantly growing as people move to live outside the center of Kuopio. Apartments for up to 3,000 new residents are planned in Hiltulanlahti. Construction began after the Saaristokaupunki in the 2010s.

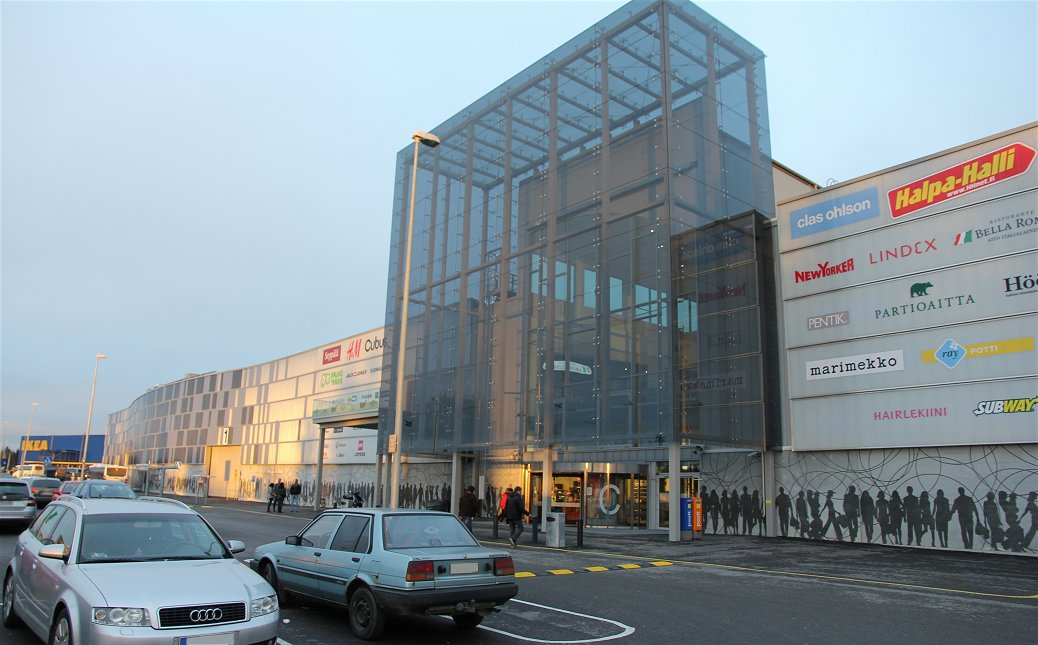
Matkus shopping centre in Hiltulanlahti

Until 2019, the school of Hiltulanlahti operated in the yellow main building built in 1926, which had been expanded with a slice school in 2003 due to a lack of space caused by the increase in the number of pupils. Premises were also put into use from the adjoining private kindergarten and evacuation containers were erected in the yard. In 2019, a new school building was completed in Hiltulanlahti, where teaching was completely transferred. The slice school was demolished in 2020.

Vanuvuori hill is the most significant attraction in Hiltulanlahti. Hiltulanlahti also has its own village committee, the monitoring house Vanula. For a long time, Takkabaari was a meeting place for villagers in Hiltulanlahti, which was in operation continuously from 1966 to 2017.

Hiltulanlahti is also home to the Matkus business area, where the Matkus Shopping Center is located.
