= Interogo Foundation =

Liechtenstein foundation

- Company type: Foundation
- Founded: 1989
- Founder: Ingvar Kamprad
- Headquarters: Liechtenstein
- Area served: Worldwide
- Subsidiaries: Interogo Holding A.G. (non-IKEA related)
- Website: www.interogofoundation.com

IKEA ownership chart
Flowchart showing the structure and ownership of IKEA companies. Parent companies are at the top of the chart.
Provides services to | Is the parent of | Provides funding to

Interogo Foundation is a foundation registered in Liechtenstein as an Unternehmensstiftung' (German: [ʊntɐˈneːmənsˌʃtɪftʊŋ], literally in English: 'enterprise foundation'). Its office is located in Vaduz, Liechtenstein. Until 2023, it owned Inter IKEA Holding B.V., registered in the Netherlands, which through its subsidiary Inter IKEA Systems controlled the intellectual property of the IKEA brand. In 2011, it was reported that the foundation controlled assets valued at US$15 billion. In 2023 it demerged, splitting off the Inter IKEA Foundation as a separate foundation that owns Inter IKEA Holding B.V.

== History ==
Interogo Foundation was founded on 29 March 1989 in Vaduz, Liechtenstein. Its aim is to secure the longevity and independence of the IKEA concept and the continued existence of Inter IKEA Holding, as well as to influence the leadership of the company.

The IKEA founder Ingvar Kamprad and his family used to control Interogo Foundation until 2013.

On 1 September 2023, the Inter IKEA Foundation was demerged from the Interogo Foundation.

=== Appo Trust ===
Until the end of 2010, the entity Appo Trust, based in Ontario, Canada, was in charge of appointing and replacing board members of Interogo Foundation. Appo Trust was controlled by the Kamprad family.

== Governance ==
The foundation board has at least two members, who at the time of the founding of Interogo Foundation were the lawyers Herbert Oberhuber and Johannes Burger. The foundation may be changed into a company or a trust if circumstances have changed so that this is in the foundation's interests. Meetings of the board are announced by the president of the foundation.

Board members are appointed by the advisory council of Interogo Foundation. In 2013, Ingvar Kamprad resigned from that council and renounced his right to appoint its members. As of 2020, the rules for appointing members of the advisory council state that Kamprad family members may not hold a majority of the seats.
