= INGKA Holding =

Holding company

INGKA Group
- Type: Holding company
- Industry: Retail
- Founded: 1982
- Founder: Ingvar Kamprad
- Headquarters: Netherlands
- Area served: Worldwide
- Key people: CEO – Juvencio Maeztu
- Revenue: ▲€37.36 billion (2020)
- Operating income: ▼€1.43 billion (2020)
- Net income: ▼€1.189 billion (2020)
- Total assets: ▼€52.2 billion (2020)
- Total equity: ▲€43.16 billion (2020)
- Number of employees: 158,400 (2018)
- Parent: Stichting INGKA Foundation
- Divisions: INGKA Centres
- Website: www.ingka.com

IKEA ownership chart
Flowchart showing the structure and ownership of IKEA companies. Parent companies are at the top of the chart.
Provides services to | Is the parent of | Provides funding to

INGKA Holding B.V. is the holding company controlled by the Swedish Kamprad family. Based in Leiden, Netherlands, it is the largest IKEA franchisee holding company and controls 367 stores of the 422 of IKEA in 2018. The company is fully owned by the Stichting INGKA Foundation. INGKA is named after Ingvar Kamprad, its Swedish founder.

== Relationship with other IKEA companies ==
Although it is the largest IKEA franchisee, INGKA Holding does not own the IKEA brand and associated trademarks; these are owned by Inter IKEA Systems in Delft, also in the Netherlands, which is the franchisor of the IKEA system and receives 3% of all IKEA revenues in royalties. Inter IKEA Systems is owned by Inter IKEA Holding, registered in Luxembourg, which is controlled, in turn, by Interogo Foundation, a Liechtenstein foundation that is also supported by the Kamprad family and is valued at approximately US$15 billion.

== Ingka Centres ==
The group's Ingka Centres division has developed several shopping centres in which IKEA is the anchor tenant, including the MEGA malls in Russia. Beginning in 2020, the division has acquired existing complexes which will be renovated to include urban IKEA locations, including Kings Mall in London, 6x6 in San Francisco, and the retail podium of the Aura condominium towers in Toronto.

Ingka Centres announced in December 2021 that it would open two malls, anchored by IKEA stores, in Gurugram and Noida in India at a cost of around ₹9,000 crore (US$930 million). Both malls are expected to open by 2025.

Following the invasion of Ukraine, Ingka halted Retail operations in Russia and in September 2023 sold all Russian "Mega" Centres to Gazprombank Group.

== Other investments ==
In September 2019, INGKA acquired an 80% stake in seven wind farms in Romania, purchased from the Danish wind turbine manufacturer Vestas. They are said to have paid $150.9m to the Danish firm through its investment unit.
