= Hammersmith tube station =

There are two London Underground stations called Hammersmith, located closely to each other:

- Hammersmith tube station (District and Piccadilly lines)
- Hammersmith tube station (Circle and Hammersmith & City lines)

== See also ==
- Hammersmith & Chiswick railway station
- Hammersmith (Grove Road) railway station
