= Inter IKEA Holding =

Holding company

Inter IKEA Holding B.V.
- Type: Holding company
- Founded: 1991; 35 years ago
- Founder: Ingvar Kamprad
- Headquarters: Delft, Netherlands
- Area served: Worldwide
- Key people: Jakub Jankowski (CEO)
- Revenue: 22,878,000,000 (2017)
- Parent: Inter IKEA Foundation
- Subsidiaries: Inter IKEA Systems B.V.; IKEA of Sweden A.B.; IKEA Supply A.G.; IKEA Industry Holding B.V.
- Website: www.inter.ikea.com

IKEA ownership chart
Flowchart showing the structure and ownership of IKEA companies. Parent companies are at the top of the chart.
Provides services to | Is the parent of | Provides funding to

Inter IKEA Holding B.V. is the holding company of Inter IKEA Group. Registered in the Netherlands, and ultimately owned by Inter IKEA Foundation, it owns the company Inter IKEA Systems and thereby controls the intellectual property of IKEA. It is also in charge of design, manufacturing and supply of IKEA products.

== History ==
The company was incorporated in 1991 as Inter IKEA Holding S.A. in Luxembourg. Between 2011 and 2016, restructuring took place among corporate entities related to IKEA, and since 2016, Inter IKEA Holding has been based in the Netherlands.

Inter IKEA Holding used to be controlled by Ingvar Kamprad, the founder of IKEA, and his family, through the advisory council of Interogo Foundation. However, in 2013, Kamprad renounced the right to appoint members to that council, and the current articles of the foundation require that Kamprad family members do not hold a majority of the seats.

In September 2026, IKEA announced price cuts of upto 28% on approximately 1500 products across Europe.

== Subsidiaries ==
=== Inter IKEA Systems ===
Inter IKEA Systems B.V. is a holding company fully owned by Inter IKEA Holding and thus Interogo Foundation. It is the company that legally owns all of the IKEA brand's intellectual property (logo, word, trademarks, etc.).

Inter IKEA Systems is the IKEA franchisor. The company releases guides and manuals of various parts of the IKEA brand. The company releases news, training, program and various other types of manuals. It also does research about the market IKEA is in and releases reports and tools to IKEA retailers. The company was incorporated in 1983, and it is based in the Netherlands.

=== IKEA of Sweden ===
IKEA of Sweden AB is responsible for designing, developing and making home furnishing products for IKEA. The company is based in Älmhult, Sweden. The company was founded in 1960.

=== IKEA Supply ===
IKEA Supply A.G. is responsible for supplying IKEA products to IKEA franchises. It owns many distribution centers around the world. It is based in Switzerland.

=== IKEA Industry ===
IKEA Industry AB produces 10-12% of the IKEA range of products. The company mostly focuses on wooden furniture. It was founded in 1991 as Swedwood International AB. The company name was changed from Swedwood International AB to IKEA Industry AB in September 2013. The company has always been based in Sweden.

=== IKEA Marketing and Communication ===
IKEA Marketing and Communication AB (formerly IKEA Communications AB) creates and maintains IKEA communication for customers and other IKEA organizations. Its responsibilities include the IKEA website, apps, brochures, TV commercials, and assembly instructions. It is based in Sweden. It is a Promoter Member of the Khronos Group.

=== IKEA Food Services ===
IKEA Food Services AB develops and produces the IKEA food and beverages products sold in IKEA stores. It is based in Sweden.

== See also ==
- Interogo Foundation
- IKEA
