= Dave Riley =

American musician, bassist in punk band Big Black

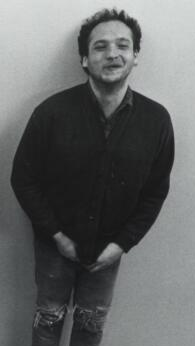
- Riley in 1986, posing for a publicity photo for Big Black

Background information
- Born: David Michael Riley; July 30, 1960
- Origin: Detroit
- Died: December 24, 2019 (aged 59) Arivaca, Arizona
- Genre: Punk rock
- Instrument: Bass guitar
- Labels: Wasteland, Homestead, Blast First, Touch and Go, Compulsive, Top Scrap Recordings

David Michael Riley (July 30, 1960 – December 24, 2019) was an American musician who was the bassist in the punk rock band Big Black from 1985 until the band's dissolution in 1987. Riley moved to Chicago in 1982 from Detroit, where he had worked as a recording engineer. He played on Big Black's two studio albums, Atomizer (1986) and Songs About Fucking (1987), as well as their Headache EP (1987), several singles, and two live albums.

After Big Black, Riley recorded tracks with several other artists before being incapacitated by a stroke in 1993, losing the ability to walk. He became a blogger, and published a book in 2006 titled Blurry and Disconnected: Tales of Sink-or-Swim Nihilism. He died in late 2019 from squamous cell carcinoma.

== Early life ==
Growing up, Riley was a misfit and often bullied, the target of what he later called "insidious crap perpetrated by imperceptive emotional retards." As a teenager he was in a car accident that permanently disfigured his face, causing a speech disorder.

== Career ==
In Detroit, Riley worked as a recording engineer at a studio where funk artists George Clinton and Sly Stone recorded. His engineering credits include Parliament's Trombipulation (1980) and Funkadelic's The Electric Spanking of War Babies (1981). He moved to Chicago in 1982 and became bassist in the punk band Savage Beliefs, who released one EP, The Moral Efficiency of Savage Beliefs (1983). He met Big Black guitarist Santiago Durango at a punk show at the Cubby Bear, where Durango, drunk and vomiting in the club's restroom, complimented his playing style. Big Black was getting ready to release their Racer-X EP (1985), but bassist Jeff Pezzati was amicably departing the band to focus on his job, fiancée, and primary band Naked Raygun. Big Black's leader, singer/guitarist Steve Albini, was also impressed by Riley's playing in Savage Beliefs and gave him a copy of Big Black's first EP, Lungs (1982), telling him "Listen to this, and if you don't think it sucks, then maybe you can play with us someday."

Riley joined Big Black the week of Racer-X's release in April 1985, while also keeping his day job as a litigation law clerk. He learned the group's repertoire, and they began writing songs for the band's first LP. That May, Riley produced and played saxophone on Ward, an EP by Chicago experimental band End Result which came out on Albini's Ruthless Records label. Big Black's Atomizer came out in 1986; in Our Band Could Be Your Life (2001), author Michael Azerrad remarks that "Riley's gnarled bass sound combined explosively with the brutally insistent hammering of the drum machine while his funk background gave the music an almost danceable kick". The album was polarizing due to its aggressive, violent music and lyrics, but won praise in the national press and became an underground success, selling 3,000 copies upon its release on Homestead Records. This led to a tour of Europe that year, on which the band met an enthusiastic response. "It was kind of overwhelming for a while," Riley told Azerrad; "Needless to say, I got used to it really damn quick. People actually appreciated what you were doing and it was kind of cool. It was much different from America. We were treated with respect in Europe."

After a falling out with Homestead and its distributor, Dutch East India Trading, Big Black signed to Touch and Go Records and released the Headache EP in spring 1987. Tensions were mounting within the band, with Riley earning Albini's ire. Albini did not drink alcohol, so Riley and Durango became drinking buddies on the road while Albini was doing interviews and handling the band's logistics. Albini later claimed that Riley was "kind of fucked up most of the time" (which Riley denied) and accused him of a number of other shortcomings including "always [being] late for rehearsal, never having equipment together, needing a ride to everything, a fresh excuse for every day, generally unkempt and unreliable, impossible to communicate with when loaded, flashes of brilliance offset by flashes of belligerence." Durango claimed that Riley's drunkenness ruined several of the band's shows, including one in Milwaukee where "he couldn't even sit on the stage. We tried to plug him in and he fought us off. He was fucked up beyond fucked up — he was FUBAR." Durango also related that at a key show at New York's CBGB, Riley drunkenly smashed the drum machine and the band had to call in Peter Prescott of opening act Volcano Suns to play live drums, but Prescott did not know the songs and the show was ruined (in a 2008 interview, when asked whether Riley had smashed the drum machine during a concert, Albini said "I don't remember anything like that ever happening"). Albini made a number of threats, but never fired Riley; Durango later remarked that "It was kind of a love-hate thing" and speculated that "maybe on some subconscious level he understood that that was something Dave brought to the band."

By late 1986 Riley was in college and both Albini and Durango had to keep day jobs, limiting the band's touring opportunities. When Durango chose to enter law school, the band decided to keep going until his schooling began in the fall of 1987 and then disband. They were now enjoying increased press, radio airplay, record sales, and concert fees, but Riley later said "Big Black was never about that. For Big Black to make any money, it wouldn't have been Big Black anymore." A final tour, from June to August 1987, took the band to Europe (including performing at the Pukkelpop festival in Belgium), the United Kingdom, Australia, and across the United States, ending with their final show at Seattle's Georgetown Steam Plant where they smashed their instruments onstage. Big Black's second studio album, Songs About Fucking, was released shortly after their breakup and became their best-selling record, with an initial pressing of 8,000 copies.

Riley worked with other bands in subsequent years: He produced Chicago hardcore punk band Rights of the Accused's 1987 album Dillinger's Alley with Iain Burgess; sang gang vocals on the song "Red" on Flour's self-titled 1988 album; produced Spongetunnel's 1989 EP (1989); played bass, piano, and additional percussion on two tracks on Algebra Suicide's 1990 album Alpha Cue; and played bass on Bull's "Tinbox" single (1992).

== Disability and writing ==
Riley had a stroke in 1993 which caused paraplegia; he was unable to walk, and used a wheelchair for the rest of his life. The doctors attending to him erroneously thought that his condition was the result of drug use or a suicide attempt, and he was forced to live in a "convalescent home" for nearly 10 years, with people he described as "lowlifes, criminals, psychopaths, and token seniors with whom nobody wanted to bother." He participated in a musical project called Miasma of Funk, engineering and doing drum programming for a track titled "The Law of Averages" on the 1997 compilation album The Glory of Destruction. He was able to get out of the government care system in 2001, and moved into an apartment south of Chicago. He later moved to a farm in west-central Illinois with longtime friend Rachel Brown, who he had met in the late 1980s. Miasma of Funk released a studio album, Groove on the Mania!, in 2004. In 2006 Riley published Blurry and Disconnected: Tales of Sink-or-Swim, a book consisting of five satirical short stories and a novella. He also started a blog that year titled "Worthless Goddamn Cripple", on which he wrote about his experiences until 2008.

Big Black reunited for a short performance on September 9, 2006, at Touch and Go Records' 25th Anniversary festival. Albini did not invite Riley to participate, later saying that "We haven't kept close contact post-Big Black, but it's been close enough to know that he wasn't in a condition to play. I didn't want to put him in an awkward position of trying to play, but not being able to do it." Instead, they called upon original bassist Jeff Pezzati and played four songs from his tenure with the band.

== Later years and death ==
In 2015 Riley and Brown retired to a small ranch near Arivaca, Arizona. In late August 2019 he was diagnosed with squamous cell carcinoma that had begun in his throat and spread to his lungs, and died on December 24, 2019. Commenting on Riley's death to Rolling Stone, Albini called him "a fantastic musician and a critical part of the Chicago music scene. He bridged the gap between raw enthusiasm and outstanding musicianship better than anybody else in our peer group and I always admired him for it", while Durango remarked "Many of my favorite Big Black memories involve Dave, including the riot he single-handedly started by taunting the audience at one of our shows in Australia. A wicked prankster. Funny, charming, smart and talented. I would glue myself to Dave on our tours. Dave was a positive force in my life and I will miss him dearly."

== Discography ==
- Parliament – Trombipulation (studio album, 1980): recording engineer
- Funkadelic – The Electric Spanking of War Babies (studio album, 1981): recording engineer
- Savage Beliefs – The Moral Efficiency of Savage Beliefs (EP, 1983): bass guitar
- Savage Beliefs – The Middle of America Compilation (various artists compilation, 1984): bass guitar on "Shake Your Neighbor's Hand", drums and vocals on "Double Standard"
- Big Black – "Rema-Rema" (single, 1985): bass guitar
- Big Black – "Il Duce" (single, 1985): bass guitar
- End Result – Ward (EP, 1985): producer, saxophone
- Big Black – Atomizer (studio album, 1986): bass guitar
- Big Black – God's Favorite Dog (various artists compilation, 1986): bass guitar on "Every Man for Himself" and "Crack Up"
- Big Black – Sound of Impact (live album, 1987): bass guitar
- Big Black – Happiness Is Dry Pants (various artists compilation, 1987): bass guitar on "Burning Indian Wife"
- Big Black – Headache (EP, 1987): bass guitar
- Big Black – "Heartbeat" (single, 1987): bass guitar
- Big Black – "He's a Whore" / "The Model" (single, 1987): bass guitar
- Big Black – Songs About Fucking (studio album, 1987): bass guitar
- Rights of the Accused – Dillinger's Alley (studio album, 1987): producer
- Big Black – The Rich Man's Eight Track Tape (compilation album, 1987): bass guitar
- Flour – Flour (studio album, 1988): gang vocals on "Red"
- Spongetunnel – 1989 (EP, 1989): producer
- Algebra Suicide – Alpha Cue (studio album, 1990): bass guitar, piano, and additional percussion on "Summer Virus Night" and "What Rubs Up to You"
- Big Black – Pigpile (video album/live album, 1992): bass guitar
- Big Black – "In My House" (single, 1992): bass guitar
- Bull – "Tinbox" (single, 1992): bass guitar
- Miasma of Funk – The Glory of Destruction (various artists compilation, 1997): recording engineer and drum programming on "The Law of Averages"
- Miasma of Funk – Groove on the Mania! (studio album, 2004)
- Savage Beliefs – Big Big Sky (compilation album, 2015): bass guitar
