= Atomizer (album) =

1986 album by Big Black

Studio album by Big Black
- Released: May 7, 1986
- Recorded: August–October, 1985
- Studio: Chicago Recording Company
- Genres: Post-punk; post-hardcore; industrial rock
- Length: 37:24
- Labels: Homestead; Touch and Go
- Producers: Iain Burgess; Big Black

Big Black chronology
Racer-X (1985)	Atomizer (1986)	The Hammer Party (1986)

Atomizer is the debut full-length album by American punk rock group Big Black released on May 7, 1986. The album is regarded as one of the greatest albums of the 1980s, and a forerunner of industrial rock.

== Background and release ==
An early cover art proposal for the album included Marvin the Martian pointing a raygun at the Earth. This was eventually discarded due to legal problems.

One song from the album, "Big Money", was released as a B-side to the "Il Duce" single prior to the release of Atomizer. Homestead Records also issued "Big Money" and "Il Duce" the A-side of a 12" record with three live songs on the B-side (including the live version of "Cables" that would appear on Atomizer) with the agreement that the 12" be used for promotional purposes only. The label sent the promo 12" to radio stations, then sold extra copies outside of Big Black's native Chicago, hoping the band would never find out. When they did, Big Black left Homestead and signed to Touch and Go Records.

In the year after Atomizer's release, Big Black recorded their 4-song Headache EP and released it with a sticker that bore the words, "Warning! Not as good as Atomizer, so don't get your hopes up, cheese." The same sticker also appeared on some copies of Sonic Youth's EP Master-Dik. That same year Atomizer was compiled onto compact disc along with the Headache EP and the band's "Heartbeat" single under the name, The Rich Man's Eight Track Tape. The CD omitted track 9 "Strange Things" (although included in a subsequent reissue), as well as the artwork and liner notes from the original records. Instead, Steve Albini expressed his general dislike for the compact disc format in the CD's liner notes, saying, "This compact disc, compiled to exploit those of you gullible enough to own the bastardly first generation digital music system, contains all-analog masters. Compact discs are quite durable, this being their only advantage over real music media. You should take every opportunity to scratch them, fingerprint them, and eat egg and bacon sandwiches off them. Don't worry about their longevity, as Philips will pronounce them obsolete when the next phase of the market-squeezing technology bonanza begins."

The song "Cables (live)" is a live version of the opening track from their 1983 EP Bulldozer, recorded “at the only benefit gig I’ve ever heard of where the club owner insisted on taking his standard cut from the door.”

== Music and lyrics ==
Passing Complexion
"Passing Complexion" has been noted as a standout track from the album

Atomizer has been described as "a distillation of the pure sonic anguish and punishing endurance tests that Big Black revelled in" by Rich Hobson of Metal Hammer. In the book Gimme Indie Rock, music journalist Andrew Earles describes the album as "Big Black at the height of its two-guitars-plus-bass-plus-drum-machine powers, forging a line-straddling, industrial-meets-nascent-noise-rock force to be reckoned with." Andy Kellman of AllMusic described the sound as "a wailing behemoth of assaultive Roland beats, Steve Albini and Santiago Durango's clanging and whirring guitars, and new member Dave Riley's lumberjack bass." The guitar work on the tracks "Passing Complexion" and "Kerosene" have been described as "warped-beyond-recognition." Kellman described the guitar intro of the latter track as "completely incapable of being accurately described by vocal imitation or physical gesture."

Hobson stated that the lyrical content on Atomizer is "every bit as depraved and grotesque as would emerge from extreme metal in the decades since." Earles opined that the album contains "generally the harshest lyrical subject matter [the band] had to offer," describing the tracks as "fictional forays into the American underbelly." The album's opening track, "Jordan, Minnesota," is controversial due to its lyrics, which describe events regarding the bust of a child pornography ring in the titular city from the perspective of the perpetrators. In congruence, Kellman stated that the album sees Albini "at his most plainspoken and bleak." Kellman also stated his belief that the track "Bad Houses" could be "a perhaps unintentional reply" to "Pink Houses" by John Mellencamp. Additionally, the album contains themes of self-immolation.

== Reception and legacy ==
Retrospective professional ratings
Review scores
Source	Rating
AllMusic	4.5/5 stars
Christgau's Record Guide	B+
Encyclopedia of Popular Music	3/5 stars
The Great Rock Discography	7/10
The Line of Best Fit	9/10
MusicHound Rock	3/5
NME	10/10
The Rolling Stone Album Guide	4.5/5 stars
Select	5/5 medals
Spin Alternative Record Guide	9/10

Reviewing for The Village Voice in September 1986, Robert Christgau wrote that, "Though they don't want you to know it, these hateful little twerps are sensitive souls—they're moved to make this godawful racket by the godawful pain of the world, which they learn about reading everything from textbooks to bondage mags. This is the brutal guitar machine thousands of lonely adolescent cowards have heard in their heads. Its creators deserve credit for finding each other and making their obsession real."

Andy Kellman of AllMusic assessed, "After countless rock and neo-industrial outfits attempted to one-up each other's levels of extremity over the years, Atomizer holds up extremely well," concluding his review by stating that the album is "as horrifying as the day it was recorded."

In the book Gimme Indie Rock, music journalist Andrew Earles stated that the album "belongs in the collection of anyone with more than a passing interest in [underground rock music]."

In 2022, Rich Hobson of Metal Hammer named the album the 9th heaviest punk rock album of all time.

=== Accolades ===
In addition to the ones mentioned below, the album was included in the book 1001 Albums You Must Hear Before You Die.

Publication	Country	Work	Accolade	Rank
Alternative Press	USA	Atomizer	Top 99 Albums of '85 to '95	#11
Spin	USA	Atomizer	100 Alternative Albums	#83
Spin	USA	Atomizer	Top 100 (+5) Albums of the Last 20 Years	#92
Kerrang	UK	Atomizer	The 100 Greatest Rock Albums	#63
Kerrang	UK	Atomizer	The Kerrang! 200 Albums For The Year 2000 (under "Essential Alt-Rock")	-
Sounds	UK	Atomizer	The Top 80 Albums from the '80s	#28
Mojo	UK	Atomizer	The 80 Greatest Albums from the 80s	-
Rockdelux	Spain	Atomizer	The 300 (+200) Best Albums from 1984–2014	-
NME	UK	Atomizer	The 500 Greatest Albums of All Time	#372
Q	UK	Atomizer	50 Heaviest Albums of All Time	-
Pitchfork	USA	"Kerosene"	The Pitchfork 500	-
Kerrang	UK	"Kerosene"	666 Songs You Must Own: The Ultimate Playlist ("Alternative Rock")	#5
Rockdelux	Spain	"Kerosene"	The Top 100 Songs from 1984–1993	#39
Robert Dimery	USA	"Kerosene"	1001 Songs You Must Hear Before You Die	-

== Notable covers ==
Among the cover versions of the song "Kerosene" is one by St. Vincent performed live at the Our Band Could Be Your Life 10th Anniversary Show at New York's Bowery Ballroom on May 22, 2011; it was named by Consequence of Sound as one of her best covers.

== Track listing ==
All tracks are written by Big Black.

No.	Title	Length
1.	"Jordan, Minnesota"	3:20
2.	"Passing Complexion"	3:05
3.	"Big Money"	2:30
4.	"Kerosene"	6:05
5.	"Bad Houses"	3:10
6.	"Fists of Love"	4:21
7.	"Stinking Drunk"	3:27
8.	"Bazooka Joe"	4:23
9.	"Strange Things"	3:54
10.	"Cables" (Live)	3:09

== Personnel ==
- Steve Albini – guitar, vocals, drum machine programming
- Santiago Durango – guitar
- Dave Riley – bass guitar
- Iain Burgess – recording engineer

Big Black always credited Roland along with the band's members, though Roland is a brand of drum machine and not an actual person. Additionally, Atomizer and all post-Atomizer releases by the band do not feature the TR-606, instead opting for the E-mu Drumulator.

== See also ==
- Jordan, Minnesota sexual abuse scandal
