= The Hammer Party =

1986 compilation album by Big Black

Compilation album by Big Black
- Released: November 12, 1986
- Recorded: 1981–1984
- Genre: Punk rock
- Length: 38:07
- Label: Homestead, Touch and Go

Big Black chronology
Atomizer (1986)	The Hammer Party (1986)	Sound of Impact (1987)

Professional ratings
Review scores
Source	Rating
AllMusic	4/5 stars
Alternative Rock	8/10
Christgau's Record Guide	B
The New Rolling Stone Album Guide	4/5 stars
Select	2/5 medals
Spin Alternative Record Guide	8/10

The Hammer Party is a compilation album of Big Black's early EPs released between 1982 and 1985. Originally released by Homestead Records on November 12, 1986, and later rereleased by Touch and Go in 1992, the LP and cassette versions featured the six songs from Lungs on one side and the six songs from Bulldozer on the other. The CD version was expanded to include Big Black's third EP, Racer-X.

== Track listing ==
1. "Steelworker" ^{1}
2. "Live in a Hole" ^{1}
3. "Dead Billy" ^{1}
4. "I Can Be Killed" ^{1}
5. "Crack" ^{1}
6. "RIP" ^{1}
7. "Cables" ^{2}
8. "Pigeon Kill" ^{2}
9. "I'm a Mess" ^{2}
10. "Texas" ^{2}
11. "Seth" ^{2}
12. "Jump the Climb" ^{2}
13. "Racer X" ^{3}
14. "Shotgun" ^{3}
15. "The Ugly American" ^{3}
16. "Deep Six" ^{3}
17. "Sleep!" ^{3}
18. "The Big Payback" (James Brown)^{3}

^{1} Lungs
^{2} Bulldozer
^{3} Racer-X (CD Only)

== Personnel ==
- Steve Albini: guitar and vocals on all tracks
- Santiago Durango: guitar on tracks 7–11 and 13–18
- Jeff Pezzati: bass on tracks 7–11 and 13–18
- Roland: drum machine
- Pat Byrne: real drums on track 7
- John Bonhan: saxophone on tracks 2 and 15
