= Steve Albini =

American musician and audio engineer (1962–2024)

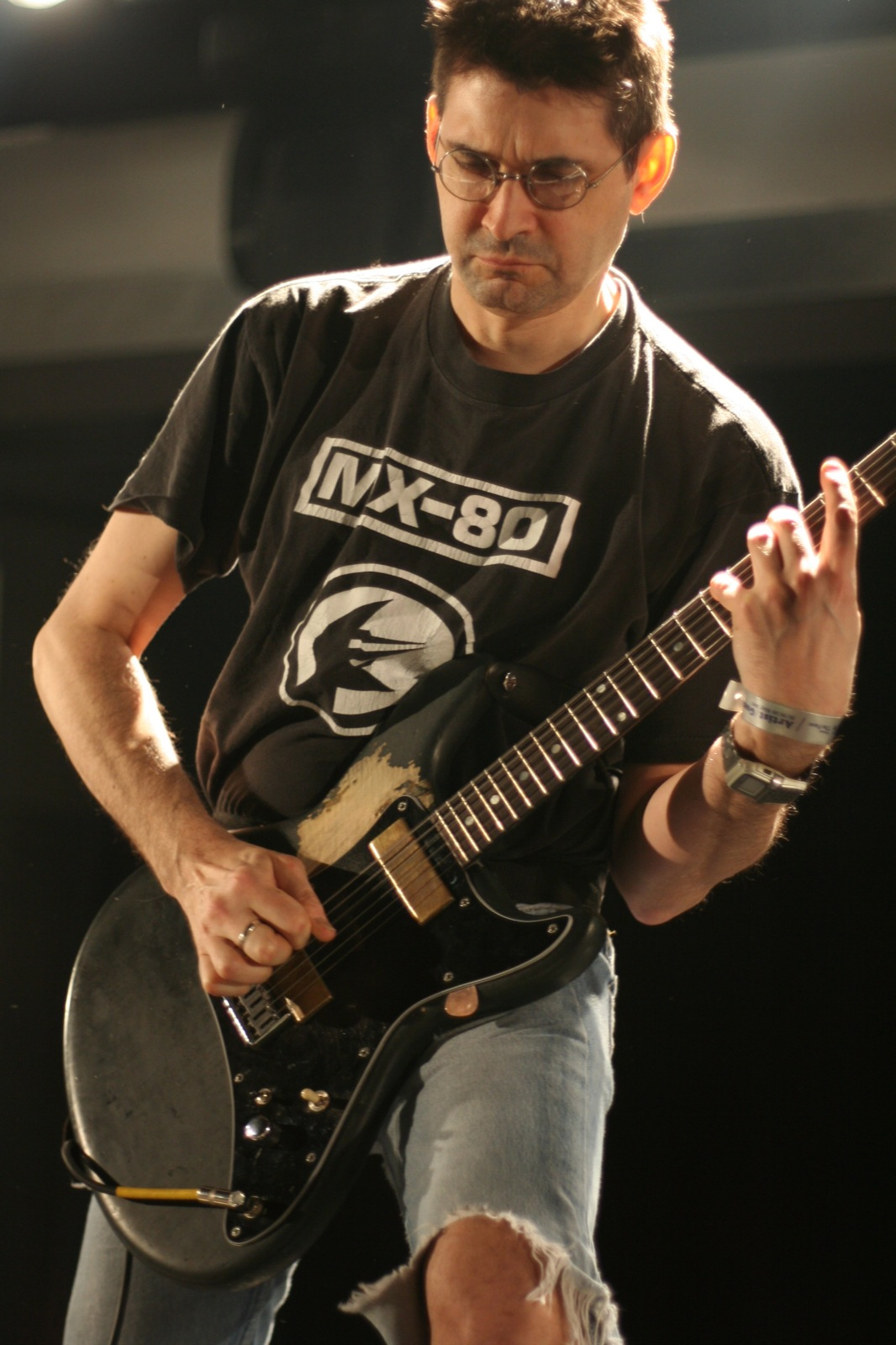
- Albini in 2007
- Born: Steven Albini (Note: Albini's parents did not give him a middle name at birth. He legally adopted his father's name, Frank, as a middle name around the year 2000.); July 22, 1962; Pasadena, California, U.S.
- Died: May 7, 2024 (aged 61); Chicago, Illinois, U.S.
- Occupations: Musician; record producer; audio engineer; music journalist
- Musical career
- Origin: Missoula, Montana, U.S.
- Genres: Punk rock; noise rock; alternative rock; math rock
- Instruments: Vocals; guitar; bass; drums
- Years active: 1981–2024
- Label: Touch and Go
- Formerly of: Big Black; Rapeman; Flour; Pigface; Pegboy; Shellac

Steven Frank Albini (/ælˈbiːni/ al-BEE-nee; July 22, 1962 – May 7, 2024) was an American musician and audio engineer. He founded and fronted the influential post-hardcore and noise rock bands Big Black (1981–1987), Rapeman (1987–1989), and Shellac (1992–2024), and engineered acclaimed albums such as the Pixies' Surfer Rosa (1988), PJ Harvey's Rid of Me, Nirvana's In Utero (both 1993), and Manic Street Preachers' Journal for Plague Lovers (2009).

Albini was born in Pasadena, California, and raised in Missoula, Montana. After discovering the Ramones as a teenager, he immersed himself in punk rock and underground culture. He earned a degree in journalism at Northwestern University, Illinois, and wrote for local zines in Chicago. He formed Big Black in 1981 and recruited Santiago Durango and Dave Riley. Big Black attracted a following, releasing two albums and four EPs. In 1987 he formed Rapeman with David Wm. Sims and Rey Washam, releasing one album and one EP in 1988. He formed Shellac with Bob Weston and Todd Trainer in 1992, with whom he released several albums, including At Action Park (1994) and 1000 Hurts (2000); To All Trains was released ten days after his death.

After Big Black's dissolution, Albini became a sought-after recording engineer, rejecting the term "record producer". He advocated analog recording, seeking a natural sound and preserving dynamics. He preferred to record live takes without overdubs, and used few effects and little compression. Albini recorded thousands of records, for acts such as the Breeders, the Jesus Lizard, Page and Plant, Godspeed You! Black Emperor, Joanna Newsom, Cheap Trick and Slint. He refused royalties, operating fee-only. He founded the Chicago recording studio Electrical Audio in 1997, dedicated to recording a live sound at a cheap price.

Noted for his outspoken and blunt opinions, Albini was critical of local punk scenes and the music industry, which he viewed as exploitative of artists. He was a strict adherent of analog recording, and praised the independence in music created by the Internet. He was also infamous for authoring transgressive art as a reaction to artistic compromise, which he expressed some regret for in his final years. He died of a heart attack in 2024.

== Early life ==
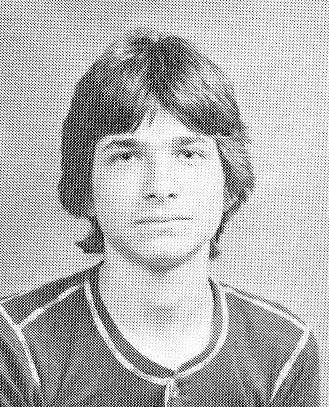
Albini, age 16, c. 1978–79, at Hellgate High School in Missoula, Montana

[O]ne thing that I discovered that I think is unusual is that I had no stage anxiety. Coincidentally, around the same time I also realised that other people's opinions of me had no power over me. As long as what I was doing was honourable in my own mind, then I could do it comfortably, and if other people didn't get it or didn't agree with it, that was okay—that didn't have any effect on me. That's carried through to this day, because I still don't give a shit if I get judged.

— Albini on his early performing experiences

Steven Albini was born in Pasadena, California, to Gina (née Martinelli) and Frank Addison Albini. His father was a wildfire researcher. He had two siblings. In his youth, Albini's family moved often as a result of their father's profession, before settling in the college town of Missoula, Montana, in 1974. Albini was Italian American, and some of his family are from the Piedmont region of Northern Italy.

Albini was introduced to the Ramones by a schoolmate when he was 14 or 15. He bought every Ramones recording available to him and credits his career to their first album. He said, "I was baffled and thrilled by music like the Ramones, the Sex Pistols, Pere Ubu, Devo, and all those contemporaneous, inspirational punk bands without wanting to try to mimic them."

At 17, Albini was struck by a car while riding his motorcycle, which resulted in a serious leg injury. During his recovery, he taught himself to play his first instrument, the bass guitar. As a teenager, Albini played in bands including the Montana punk band Just Ducky, the Chicago band Small Irregular Pieces of Aluminum, and another band that the record label Touch and Go Records said Albini was "paying us not to mention".

After graduating from Hellgate High School, Albini moved to Evanston, Illinois, to attend college at the Medill School of Journalism at Northwestern University, where he earned a degree in journalism. He said that he studied painting in college with Ed Paschke, who he called a brilliant educator and "one of the only people in college who actually taught me anything".

In the Chicago area, Albini covered the nascent punk rock scene in zines including Matter and later Boston's Forced Exposure, and gained a reputation for the iconoclastic nature of his articles. About the same time, he began recording musicians and engineered his first album in 1981. He co-managed Ruthless Records with John Kezdy of the Effigies and Jon Babbin of Criminal IQ Records. According to Albini, he maintained a "straight job" for five years until 1987, working in a photography studio as a photograph retouch artist.

== Musician ==
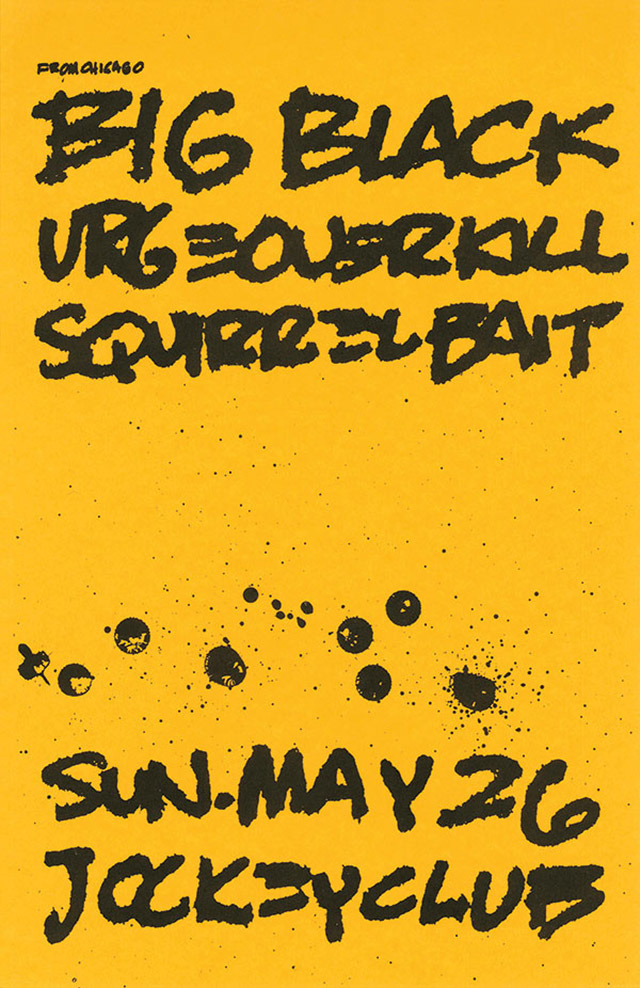
A flyer designed by Albini for a show with Big Black, Urge Overkill, and Squirrel Bait at the Jockey Club in Newport, Kentucky, on May 26, 1985

=== Career ===
==== 1981–1987: Big Black ====
Albini formed Big Black in 1981 while he was a student at Northwestern and recorded their debut EP Lungs, released on Ruthless Records. He played all of the instruments on Lungs except the saxophone, played by his friend John Bohnen. The Bulldozer (1983) EP followed on Ruthless and Fever Records.

Jeff Pezzati and Santiago Durango, of Chicago band Naked Raygun, and live drummer Pat Byrne joined shortly after, and the band—along with a Roland TR-606 drum machine — released the 1984 EP Racer-X after touring and signing a contract with the Homestead Records business. Pezzati was replaced on bass by Dave Riley, with whom the group recorded their debut full-length album Atomizer (1986). The band also released The Hammer Party while signed to Homestead, which was a compilation of the Lungs and Bulldozer EPs.

Big Black signed to Touch and Go in late 1985/early 1986, and released the EP Headache and the 7-inch single Heartbeat. Later that year they released the live album Sound of Impact on the British label Not/Blast First, a former imprint of Mute Records. In 1987, Big Black released their second and final full-length album Songs About Fucking and the single "He's a Whore / The Model", both on Touch and Go. They disbanded that year after a period of extensive touring. However, Songs About Fucking became a defining record in the decade's U.S. punk scene. Also, it caught the attention of Robert Plant, who later chose Albini to produce Walking Into Clarksdale, his album with Jimmy Page.

==== 1987–1989: Rapeman ====
Albini formed Rapeman in 1987, with the name taken from a manga series. The band consisted of Albini on vocals and guitar, Rey Washam on drums and David Wm. Sims on bass. Both Washam and Sims were previously members of Scratch Acid. They broke up after the release of two 7-inch singles, the EP Budd and the album Two Nuns and a Pack Mule (both 1988). In 2023, Albini said he had become embarrassed by the name.

==== 1992–2024: Shellac ====
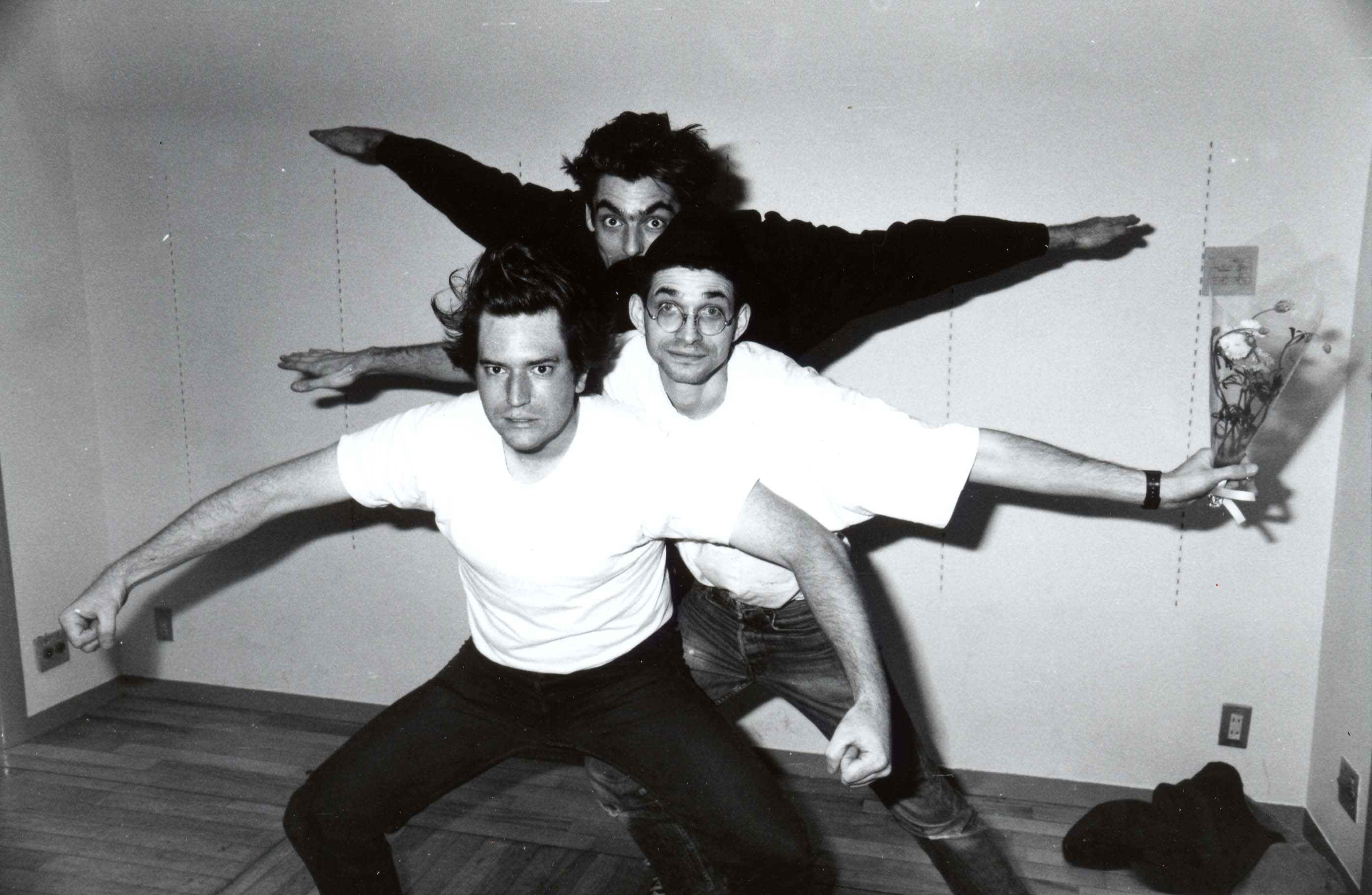
Shellac in Shibuya, Tokyo, c. November 1993. Front to back: Weston, Albini, and Trainer.

Albini formed Shellac in 1992 with Bob Weston (formerly of Volcano Suns) and Todd Trainer (of Rifle Sport, Breaking Circus and Brick Layer Cake). They released six studio albums in his lifetime: At Action Park (1994), The Futurist (1997), Terraform (1998), 1000 Hurts (2000), Excellent Italian Greyhound (2007) and Dude Incredible (2014). Albini died ten days before the release of their seventh studio album To All Trains (2024).

=== Influences ===
Albini said that "anybody can play notes. There's no trick. What is a trick and a good one is to make a guitar do things that don't sound like a guitar at all. The point here is stretching the boundaries." He praised guitarists including Andy Gill of Gang of Four, Rowland S. Howard of the Birthday Party, John McKay of Siouxsie and the Banshees, Keith Levene of Public Image Ltd, Steve Diggle and Pete Shelley of Buzzcocks, Ron Asheton of the Stooges, Paul Fox of the Ruts, Greg Ginn of Black Flag, Lyle Preslar of Minor Threat, John McGeoch of Magazine and the Banshees, and Tom Verlaine of Television.

== Sound engineer ==
Albini became widely known after recording the 1988 Pixies album Surfer Rosa. According to the Rolling Stone journalist Rob Sheffield, Albini gave the album a "raw room-tone live crunch, especially the heavy drums and slashing guitars". The journalist Michael Azerrad wrote: "The recordings were both very basic and very exacting: Albini used few special effects; got an aggressive, often violent guitar sound; and made sure the rhythm section slammed as one."

Albini did not see himself as a record producer, which he defined as someone completely responsible for a recording session. Instead, he described himself as an audio engineer. He left creative decisions to the artist and saw it as his job to satisfy them. Albini felt that putting producers in charge often destroyed records and that the role of the recording engineer was to solve technical problems, not to threaten the artist's creative control, and he never sought album sleeve credit. Instead of "producer", Albini preferred the term "recording engineer". He felt that his involvement in recording was unimportant and sometimes created public relations problems for acts, or could distract from the record. He refused to accept royalties, preferring to charge a fixed fee. At the time of his death, Albini charged $900 a day, less than a quarter of the rate a producer of his experience would typically charge. He would occasionally work unpaid if an act ran out of money, preferring not to leave work unfinished.

Albini was a vocal critic of major labels and artists, but would work with anyone who requested his service regardless of their style or ability. He required no audition, only an expectation that the act would take their work seriously. He said he was willing to work with "anyone who calls on the phone ... If someone rings because he wants to make a record, I say yes." In The Vinyl District, Joseph Neff wrote: "When enlisted by the big leagues, Albini took his job just as seriously as when he was assisting on the debut recording from a bunch of aspiring unknowns."

In 2004, Albini estimated that he had engineered 1,500 records. By 2018, his estimate had increased to several thousand. He worked with artists including Nirvana, the Breeders, Godspeed You! Black Emperor, Mogwai, The Fleshtones, the Jesus Lizard, Don Caballero, PJ Harvey, the Wedding Present, Joanna Newsom, Superchunk, Low, Dirty Three, Jawbreaker, Neurosis, Cloud Nothings, Bush, Chevelle, Page and Plant, Helmet, Fred Schneider, the Stooges, Nina Nastasia, Cheap Trick, Motorpsycho, Slint, mclusky, Labradford, Veruca Salt, and the Auteurs.

=== Methods ===
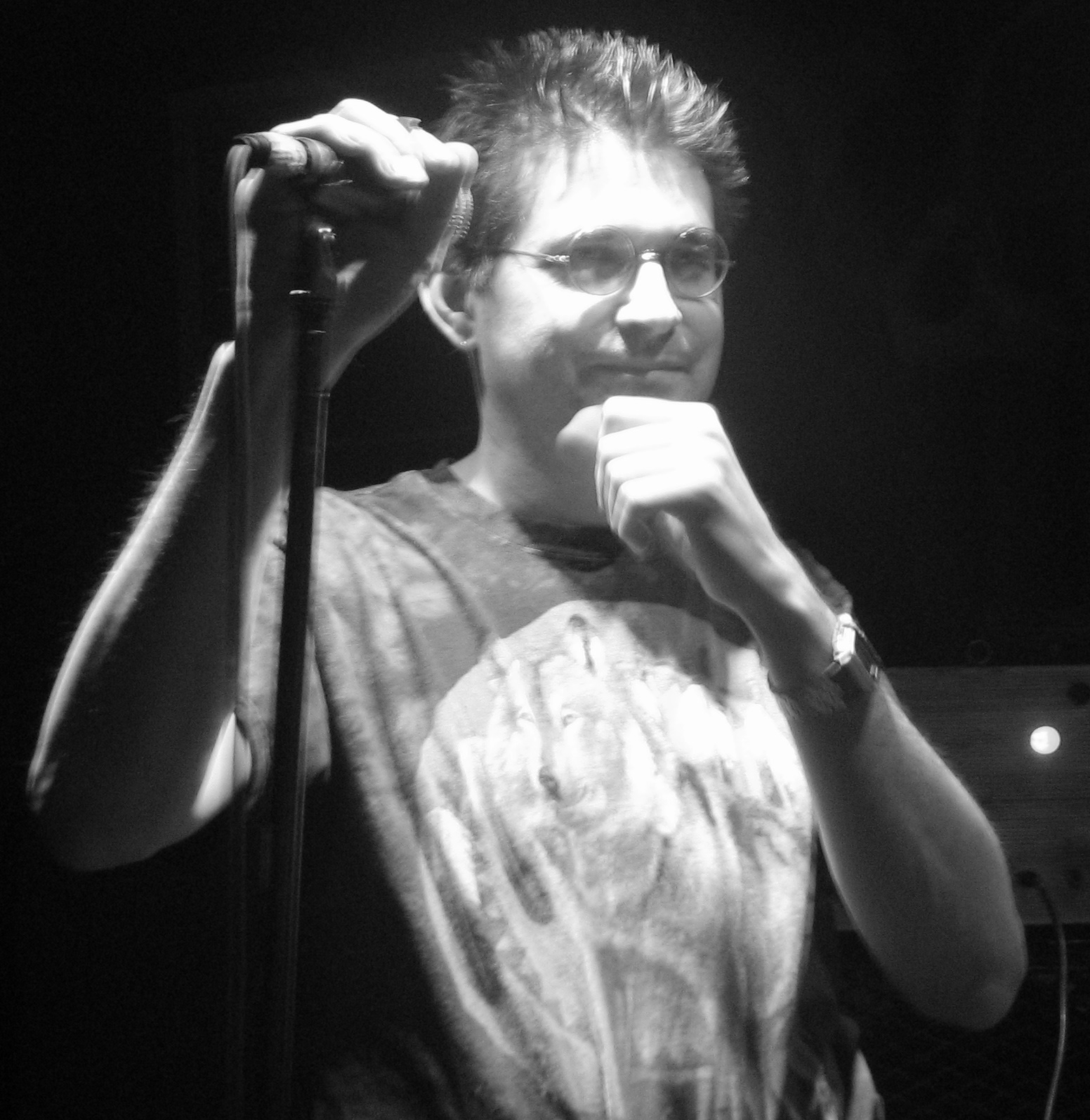
Albini in 2007

Albini's recording style was influenced by the English producer and engineer John Loder, who recorded numerous early punk records "cheaply and quickly in a small studio". Loder engineered a session with Big Black and impressed Albini with his efficiency, knowledge of the equipment and "sensitivity to the band". Albini was also influenced by the English engineer Iain Burgess, who inspired him to avoid excessive overdubbing, processing, and click tracks, and to seek rooms that had natural reverberation. Albini would spend about a week on average recording an album, including mixing.

Albini preferred to record bands together in live takes rather than overdubbing, believing this created the most natural result. He aimed to create a faithful document of the performance, and said "I would be very happy if my fingerprints weren't visible", but conceded that it was impossible to have an "objective perspective in the studio". He typically used few effects and little compression, preferring to preserve dynamics and "hear the band rather than the machine", and would only use artificial reverb if an artist requested it.

Albini took a straightforward approach to mixing. As he put it: "99 percent of mixing is moving the faders up and down until you find where it sounds good… Not screwing with the sound, not dreaming up elaborate effects, not manipulating the sound." In a letter he wrote to Nirvana before the sessions for In Utero, he explained that he preferred to mix records he tracked himself rather than give them to a dedicated mixing engineer.

Albini advocated analog recording, believing it was irresponsible to give clients digital files as masters as he feared emerging digital formats would become unusable in later formats. In "The Problem with Music", he wrote that Digital Audio Tape "sounds like shit" and that "using [it] for final masters is almost fraudulently irresponsible" due to how quickly he had seen it deteriorate. In 2005, he said he disliked recording with computers, finding that software was unreliable and overcomplex. He said he had never felt limited by his equipment and had never had to tell an artist that something was impossible without computers. He was skeptical of digital manipulation, saying: "I don't understand where the impulse comes from to make a record that doesn't have any relationship to the sound of the real band. That seems crazy to me."

In 2021, Albini acknowledged that digital noise reduction technologies could be useful in an analog setting and that certain genres of music had developed that relied on digital tools. However, he expressed concerns about the viability of digital storage for preservation, saying "music that's made principally from virtual instruments and samples and sequences... there's no reason to have an analog session for music like that. I think there is a reason, from a cultural perspective, to make an analog capture of it once it's all over with so that... in the distant future, people will know what it sounded like."

=== Sound ===
According to The Guardian, Albini was "especially good at capturing the raw sound of a band, as though they were playing right in front of you"; bands would hire him in an attempt to sound "realer". Pitchfork wrote that Albini "captured the quiet and the loud all at once". Stereogum described his recording sound as "open, dry, claustrophobic, brutally honest". Steve Von Till of Neurosis, who recorded several albums with Albini, said in 2013: "He is the best damn engineer in the world, I believe. He's very traditional, there's no tricks, there's no fix it later. There's only an extremely high-fidelity approach towards capturing a natural performance in a room."

Albini disputed the idea that his records had a specific sound and dismissed his reputation for working with "hard-hitting grunge bands", pointing out that he had recorded hundreds of acoustic albums and that he did not impose his own taste on his clients. He said most artists wanted him to create an "organic" sound. Albini said his opinion on the quality of a song or an arrangement was irrelevant, and that it would be inappropriate to tell a musician they were wrong about their music: "It's like saying, 'Here, let me show you how to fuck your wife. You're doing it all wrong.'" He felt his musical preferences were obscure and that imposing them would "make a lot of freakish records that wouldn't flatter the band in any way, and no one would like them".

=== Electrical Audio ===
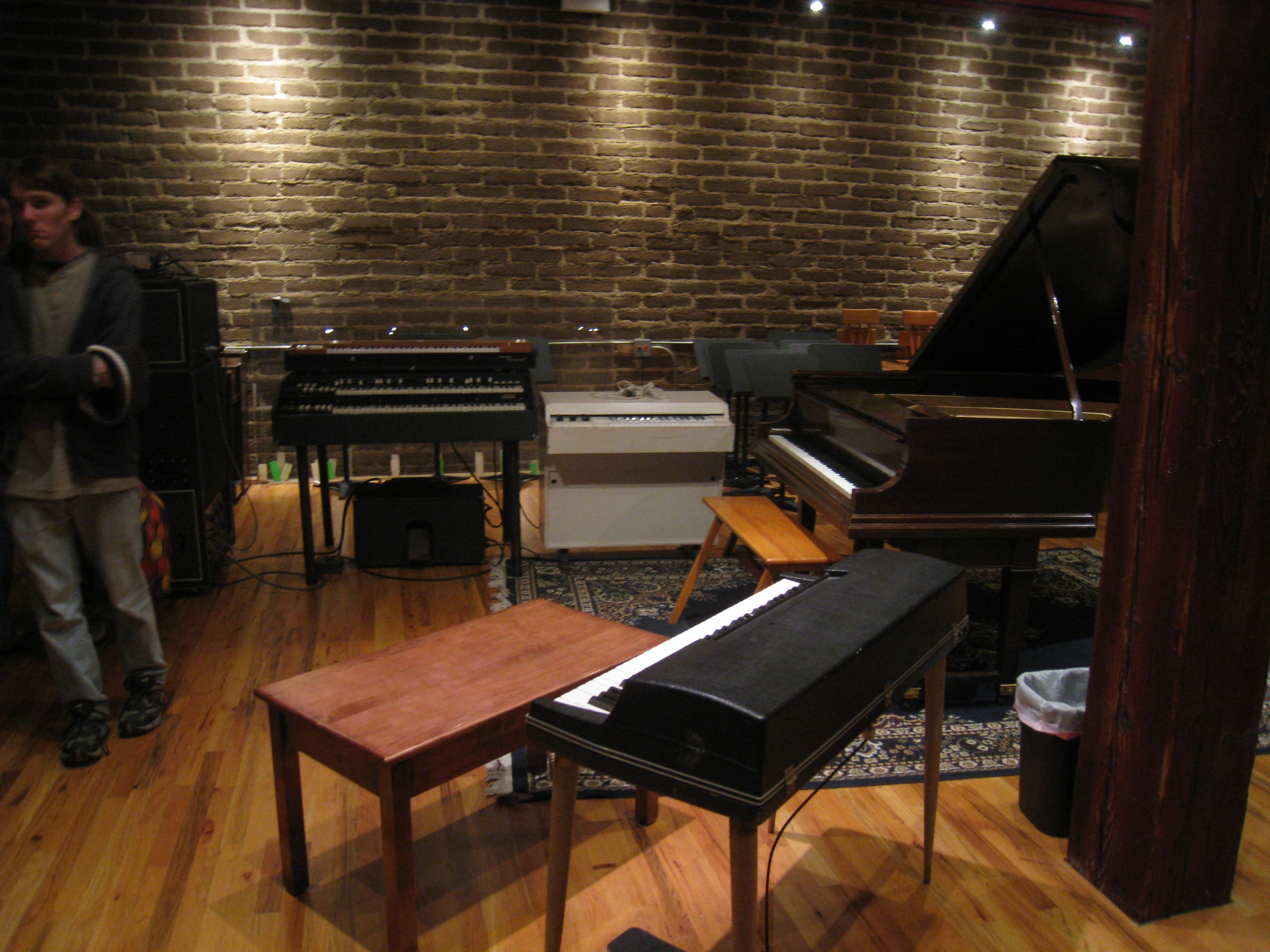
Studio A in Electrical Audio

Albini's first studio was in the basement of a personal residence. The musician Robbie Fulks recalled the hassle of "running up two flights of stairs all the time from the tracking room" to communicate with Albini. Following this arrangement, Albini created recording space in the house he shared with his partner, but this eventually took over almost all the rooms, with the exception of the bedroom. To remedy the lack of privacy, Albini bought a space to create Electrical Audio in 1995.

During his first years at Electrical Audio, Albini's unpopularity with major labels in the wake of engineering Nirvana's In Utero (1993) made it difficult to secure consistent work. Although he produced Bush's chart-topping 1996 album Razorblade Suitcase, Albini's refusal to take royalties meant that he saw little passive income from producing music. He charged a flat fee, with higher rates for major label artists and more affordable prices for smaller bands. He preferred not to be credited and would seemingly work with any artist who reached out to him. To pay bills and keep the studio open, he was forced to sell off studio equipment, guitars, and vinyl records.

== Views ==
=== Music industry ===
In 1993, Albini published a widely shared essay, "The Problem with Music", in The Baffler. Albini argued that record companies exploit artists and illustrated how bands can remain in debt even after selling hundreds of thousands of albums. He presented a hypothetical financial breakdown for a rock band with a $250,000 record deal, showing that while the label earned $710,000 and the producer made $90,000, each band member received only $4,031.25. Albini was also very critical of Sonic Youth's decision to sign with Geffen Records, stating that they "chose to join the mainstream culture and become a foot soldier for that culture's encroachment into my neck of the woods by acting as scouts", and that they induced many bands from the American underground to make "very stupid career moves." He still considered them friends and felt that their music managed to keep its own integrity, but stressed that they should be embarrassed about their behavior.

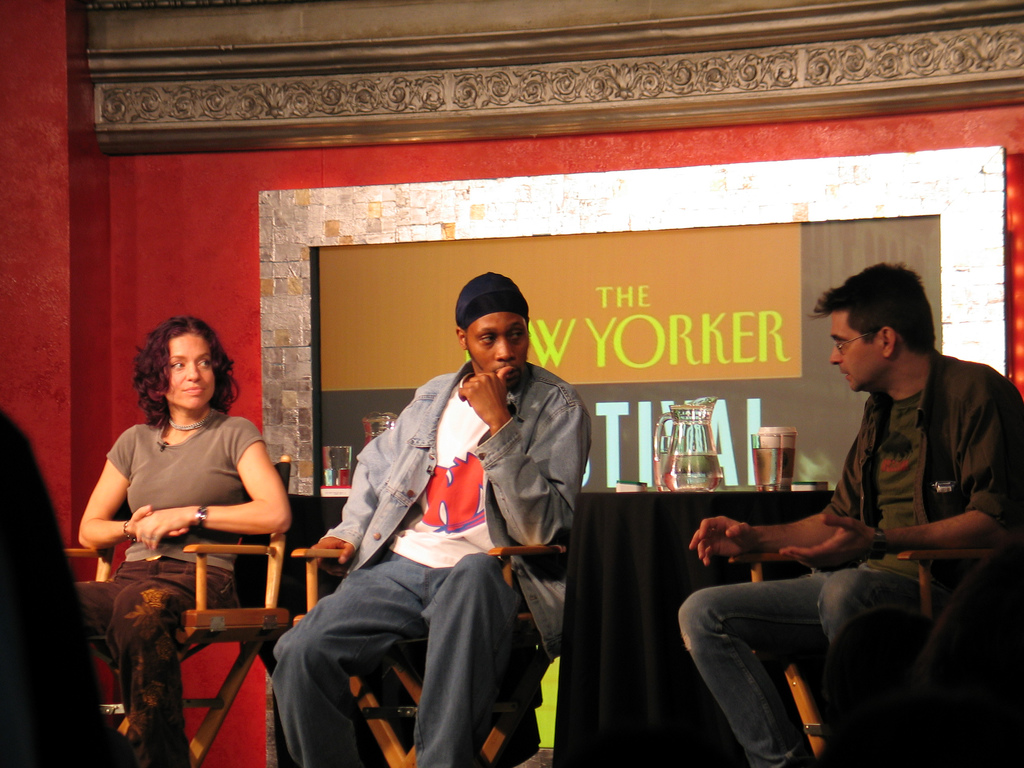
Albini (right) with Ani DiFranco and RZA at The New Yorker festival in September 2005

In November 2014, Albini delivered the keynote speech at the Face the Music conference in Melbourne, Australia, in which he discussed the evolution of the music industry over his career. He described the pre-Internet corporate industry as "a system that ensured waste by rewarding the most profligate spendthrifts in a system specifically engineered to waste the band's money", which aimed to perpetuate its structures and business arrangements while preventing almost all but the biggest acts from earning a living. He contrasted it with the independent scene, which encouraged resourcefulness and established an alternative network of clubs, promoters, fanzines, DJs and labels, and whose greater efficiency allowed musicians to make a reasonable income.

As part of the Face the Music speech, Albini noted that both the corporate and independent industry models had been damaged by filesharing. However, he praised the spread of free music as a "fantastic development", which allowed previously ignored music and bands to find an audience; the use of the Internet as a distribution channel for music to be heard worldwide; and the increasing affordability of recording equipment, all of which allow bands to circumvent the traditional recording industry. Albini also argued that the increased availability of recorded music stimulates demand for live music, boosting artists' income.

In 2018, Albini said the reduction in the power of record labels over the preceding 25 years had reduced the prevalence of producers who are there only to exert artistic control over the recording. In contrast, he felt that digital recording created more freedom for people to do productive work as engineers. Albini saw the increasing affordability of high-quality recording equipment as a positive development, as it allowed bands greater freedom to record without studios.

=== Journalism ===
From 1983 to 1986, Albini wrote for the newly launched Chicago music magazine Matter. He wrote in each issue a chronicle called "Tired of Ugly Fat?", and contributed articles such as "Husker Du? Only Their Hairdresser Knows For Sure". While in Australia in November 2014, Albini spoke with national radio station Double J and stated that, while the music industry was healthy in his view, music journalism was in crisis. He cited the media attention he received after criticizing Amanda Palmer for not paying her musicians after receiving over $1 million on Kickstarter to release her 2012 album Theatre Is Evil, saying: "I don't think I was wrong but I also don't think that it was that big of a deal." He described the music media as "superficial" and composed of "copy-paste bullshit".

Albini frequently expressed a dislike for pop music, which he said was "for children and idiots". When the electronic music producer Powell wrote to him asking permission to sample a Big Black record, Albini replied explaining his dislike for electronic dance music: "I've always detested mechanised dance music, its stupid simplicity, the clubs where it was played, the people who went to those clubs, the drugs they took, the shit they liked to talk about, the clothes they wore, the battles they fought amongst each other … basically all of it, 100 per cent hated every scrap ... I detest club culture as deeply as I detest anything on Earth." However, he allowed Powell to use the sample and to use his reply in a billboard advertising the record, writing: "Don't care. Enjoy yourself."

=== Transgressive behavior ===
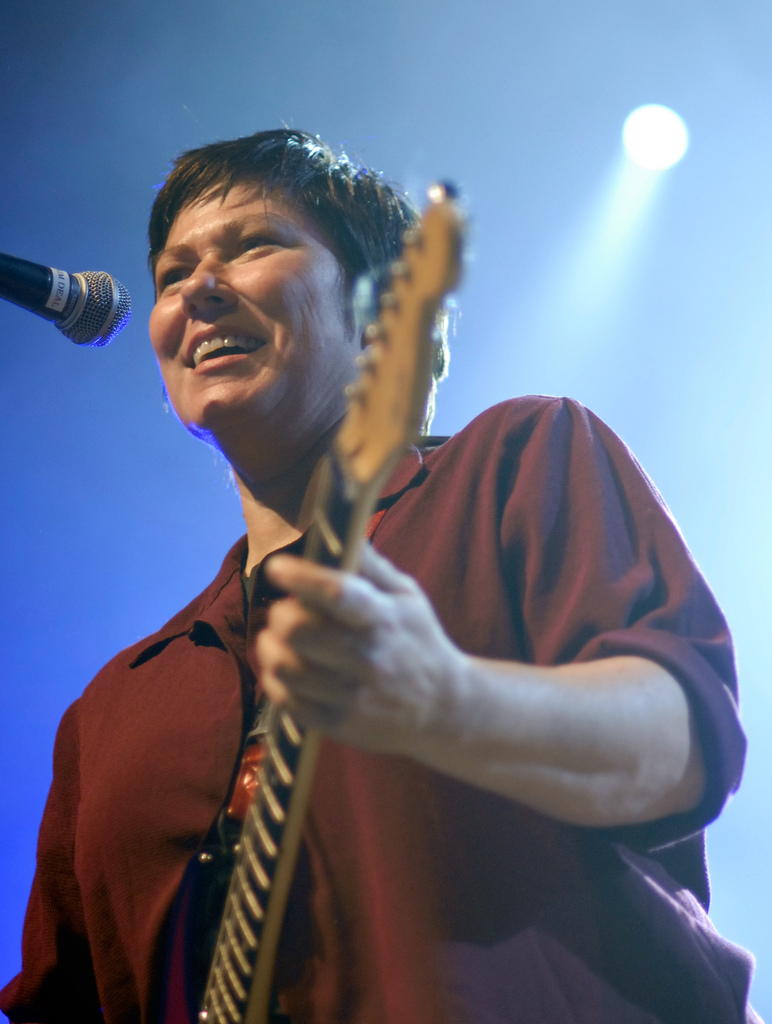
Kim Deal (pictured 2009), a close friend of Albini, said she was shocked by his past statements and that he had become a better person.

Albini was noted for his abrasive views, especially during the 1980s, when his bluntness was regarded in the alternative rock scene as a sign of authenticity. In 1986, the music critic Robert Christgau praised his early albums but described Albini and his band as "hateful little twerps". During performances of the Atomizer track "Jordan, Minnesota", about a child sex ring scandal, Albini would sometimes pretend to be a child being raped. Albini also originally named Big Black's EP Bulldozer as Hey Nigger in 1983 because "anyone stupid enough to be offended by that title is part of the problem... It's better to be confrontational about things like this. Of course I think judging people by the color of their skin is absurd." However, his bandmates made him change the title. After Big Black's disbandment, Albini played as part of the short-lived band Run Nigger Run (with Nash Kato of Urge Overkill), the name taken from the tagline of a 1970s blaxploitation film. The band performed a song called "Pray I Don't Kill You Faggot".

Writing for local zines in the 1980s, Albini wrote fiercely critical reviews of other local bands and feuded with local venues. In 1994, after albums by Urge Overkill, the Smashing Pumpkins and Liz Phair brought new attention to the Chicago music scene, Albini wrote a letter to the Chicago Reader titled "Three Pandering Sluts and Their Music-Press Stooge". In the letter, Albini described Phair as "a fucking chore to listen to", the Smashing Pumpkins as "ultimately insignificant" and Urge Overkill as "weiners in suits playing frat party rock". In the independent music magazine Forced Exposure, Albini criticized bands he had worked with; he called the Pixies "blandly entertaining college rock ... Never have I seen four cows more anxious to be led around by their nose rings." Of Poster Children he wrote "they had a really fruity drummer for a while, but I think he died of the syph". He described the songwriter Courtney Love as a "psycho hose-beast". The Chicago Reader critic Bill Wyman wrote that Albini's fanzine contributions "display a remarkably clear expository style and a vituperative flair that I wish more mainstream writers possessed".

Albini expressed regret about his behavior. In 2021, he wrote in a widely shared thread on Twitter that he was "overdue for a conversation about my role in inspiring 'edgelord' shit", saying "a lot of things I said and did from an ignorant position of comfort and privilege are clearly awful and I regret them". He added he had falsely assumed that many social problems, such as misogyny and homophobia, were already solved, especially as the underground musical communities he moved in were "broadly inclusive". He often treated fascism and authoritarianism as jokes in his younger years, and regretted that he did not foresee what he saw as a resurgence of these ideas. In 2023, Albini's friend Kim Deal, who worked with Albini when recording with the Pixies and the Breeders, said she was shocked by Albini's past statements and said "I could just break into tears, the human he's become".

== Personal life ==
Albini was married to the film director Heather Whinna. They lived in Chicago. He avoided drugs and alcohol; his father was an alcoholic, which made him aware of his "own vulnerability to addiction". Albini maintained a food blog, documenting meals he had cooked for Whinna. The Los Angeles Times described him as a "good food writer" with a "laconic, dry wit". Albini appeared on the food show Anthony Bourdain: Parts Unknown. From 1996, Albini and Whinna were involved in charity drives during the Christmas season, responding to letters addressed to Santa in the Chicago post office. They experienced conflict in deliveries after a "policy change" by the USPS in 2009 over including personal details.

Albini was an avid poker player, particularly in mixed games. He won two World Series of Poker bracelets: in 2018, Albini finished first in a $1,500 stud event for $105,629; and won a $1,500 H.O.R.S.E. event in 2022 for $196,089. He described his relationship to the game in a 2022 PokerNews article: "Poker is one part of my life. So when I'm playing poker, I try to commit to it. I try to take it seriously. I try to make sure I devote the attention to it that it deserves as an occupation. But it's only part of my year. I only play tournaments at the World Series of Poker. I play cash games informally in Chicago. It's a part of my livelihood, but it's not my profession."

== Death and legacy ==
Albini died from a heart attack at his home in Chicago, on May 7, 2024, at the age of 61. Dave Grohl dedicated a performance of the Foo Fighters song "My Hero" in his memory, and Joanna Newsom did the same with a performance of her song "Cosmia". On June 30, the stretch of Belmont Avenue where Electrical Audio is located was given the honorary title "Steve Albini Way".

== Selected publications ==
- "Husker Du? Only Their Hairdresser Knows for Sure" Article for Matter on Hüsker Dü, published September 1983.
- "I would like to be paid like a plumber" Letter written by Steve Albini to Nirvana in 1992, outlining his working philosophy
- "The Problem with Music" Essay written by Steve Albini for The Baffler in 1993.
- "Ask a music scene micro celebrity" Steve Albini answers questions about bands and music on a poker forum, The 2+2 Forums, July 7, 2007. Archived from the original on April 17, 2010.
- "I am Steve Albini, ask me anything" reddit IAmA, May 8, 2012; accessed June 21, 2015.
- "Steve Albini talks to LISTEN: "I try to be an ally in feminism"" Interview in LISTEN, May 2, 2016; accessed August 16, 2016.
