= Master-Dik =

EP by Sonic Youth
- Released: November 4, 1987 (US); January 22, 1988 (UK)
- Studio: Sear Sound, New York City; Wharton's Palace of Confusion
- Genre: Rap rock
- Length: 19:22
- Label: SST, Blast First

Sonic Youth chronology
Sister (1987)	Master-Dik (1987)	Daydream Nation (1988)

Professional ratings
Review scores
Source	Rating
AllMusic	2/5 stars
Blurt	6/10 stars
Robert Christgau	C+
The Rolling Stone Album Guide	2/5 stars

Master-Dik is the third EP by American alternative rock band Sonic Youth. It was released on November 4, 1987, in the United States by record label SST, and on January 22, 1988, in the United Kingdom by label Blast First.

== Background ==
Inspired by New York City hip hop from the late 1980s, the title song used a drum machine, sampled Kiss, and name-dropped Ciccone Youth, a name under which Sonic Youth had released a single in 1986 and would use again for an album in 1988. The B-sides comprised several interview snippets, parody and/or cover songs that pay tribute to and/or mention the Ramones, the Jesus and Mary Chain, the Beatles, Sun Ra, Max Roach, Sonny Sharrock, George Benson, and Ringo Starr, plus short-form sound collages, field recordings, musique concrète, and human beatboxing. Dinosaur Jr.'s J. Mascis plays guitar on "Beat on the Brat".

Master-Dik's liner notes reprinted a rant by Ben Weasel from the November 1987 issue of the fanzine Maximumrocknroll. In the article, Weasel criticized Sonic Youth, Hüsker Dü and several other indie rock bands from the 1980s for eschewing punk rock for a boring classic rock sound. Etchings on the vinyl's inner groove read "Ciccone death rock dream tinkle" on one side, and "Humpy pumpy psychoacoustik frenzy" on the other. When it was originally released, the album sleeve bore a sticker reading "Not as good as Atomizer, so don't get your hopes up, cheese!" The same sticker had originally appeared on Big Black's 1987 EP Headache, and referred to that band's previous album.

== Track listing ==
All tracks are written by Sonic Youth, except the Beatles cover "Ticket to Ride", written by Lennon-McCartney, and the Ramones cover "Beat on the Brat", written by Joey Ramone.

Side A
No.	Title	Length
1.	"Master-Dik"	5:01

Side B
No.	Title	Length
1.	"Beat on the Brat" (Ramones cover)	2:31
2.	"Under the Influence of the Jesus and Mary Chain" (recorded live on Suisse Radio)	0:43
3.	"Ticket to Ride / Master-Dik (Version) / Introducing the Stars"	3:14
4.	"Ringo / He's on Fire / Florida Oil Drums / Westminster Chimes"	1:40
5.	"Chinese Jam"	1:11
6.	"Vibrato / Guitar Lick / Funky Fresh"	2:24
7.	"Our Backyard"	2:17
8.	"Traffik"	0:05

== Personnel ==
Sonic Youth

- Thurston Moore
- Kim Gordon
- Lee Ranaldo
- Steve Shelley

Additional personnel

- J. Mascis – guitar ("Master-Dik", "Beat on the Brat")
- Martin Bisi – engineer ("Master-Dik")
- Bill Titus – engineering ("Master-Dik")
- Wharton Tiers – engineering ("Beat on the Brat")
- Peter Anderson – sleeve photography
- Terry Pearson – mixing ("Under the Influence of The Jesus and Mary Chain / Ticket to Ride / Master-Dik (Version) / Introducing the Stars")
