= Songs About Fucking =

1987 album by Big Black

Studio album by Big Black
- Released: September 10, 1987
- Genres: Noise rock; post-hardcore; punk rock; industrial rock
- Length: 29:08
- Label: Touch and Go
- Producer: Big Black

Big Black chronology
The Rich Man's Eight Track Tape (1987)	Songs About Fucking (1987)	Pigpile (1992)

Songs About Fucking is the second and final studio album by American rock band Big Black, released on September 10, 1987, by Touch and Go Records. The album includes a rendition of Kraftwerk's "The Model" in a remixed version from that which appeared on Big Black's then-recent single. The compact disc of Songs About Fucking added the other side of that single, a cover of Cheap Trick's "He's a Whore".

== Background and recording ==
Steve Albini has said that Songs About Fucking is the Big Black album that he is most satisfied with. In a 1992 interview with Maximumrocknroll magazine, Albini said:

The best was side one of Songs About Fucking. I was real pleased with the way we did that. We just hopped into the studio, banged all the songs out and hopped out. Didn't take long, didn't cost much, just real smooth. Side two we recorded at a more leisurely pace and I think that hurt us. And that Cheap Trick song got on the tape and the CD by accident, and we just left it on.

The band had already decided to split up before the album was recorded, prompted by guitarist Santiago Durango's decision to enroll in law school and the band's desire to quit at what they felt was a creative peak.

== Music and lyrics ==
The Power of Independent Trucking

In the book Gimme Indie Rock, music journalist Andrew Earles assessed that Songs About Fucking is "the heaviest, most lyrically poignant, and hardest-rocking" entry in the Big Black's discography. According to Mehan Jayasuriya of Pitchfork, the album "covers a wide range of unusual topics [such as] grotesque execution methods, a psychedelic fungus [and] cats. When sex does appear in these songs, it’s usually as a means of getting at something darker, like perversion, domination, or violence. Save for Albini’s occasional bursts of black humor, the album is unrelenting as it plumbs the depths of depravity; a more accurate title might have been Songs About Cruelty." On their live album Pigpile Albini kicks off the song "Fish Fry" saying "This song is about a murder in a drive in" and the song "L-Dopa" by saying "This song is about sleeping sickness".

== Artwork ==
The cover art comes from a Japanese hentai manga.

== Critical reception ==
Retrospective professional ratings
Review scores
Source	Rating
AllMusic	4.5/5 stars
Christgau's Record Guide	A−
The Encyclopedia of Popular Music	3/5 stars
The Great Rock Discography	8/10
MusicHound Rock	3.5/5 stars
NME	9/10
The Rolling Stone Album Guide	4/5 stars
Select	5/5 medals
Spin Alternative Record Guide	9/10

Songs About Fucking has been called "certainly the most honest album title of the rock 'n' roll era". Lyrical themes on the album include South American killing techniques ("Colombian Necktie"), psychedelic substances ("Ergot"), and how "slowly, without trying, everyone becomes what he despises most".

While the album's title (commonly blanked out when displayed in shops on its release) and the sleeve were controversial, according to one reviewer, "as brutal as that cover is, the music is even more so", and it was considered "as dark and frightening as the band name suggests" by another, Treble's Hubert Vigilla, who goes on to say "Songs About Fucking is loud, it's abrasive, it's unattractive in the extreme ... So really, it's everything that made Big Black so great in the first place". Dave Henderson of Underground magazine gave the album a 2.5/3 rating, calling it "a napalm attack that sticks to your skin like burning party-jell, spiced with hundreds and thousands, a prickly sensation that's as all-consuming as it is repellent". Reviewing for The Village Voice in April 1988, Robert Christgau found Albini's innovative guitar sounds undeniable: "That killdozer sound culminates if not finishes off whole generations of punk and metal. In this farewell version it gains just enough clarity and momentum to make its inhumanity ineluctable, and the absence of lyrics that betray Albini's roots in yellow journalism reinforces an illusion of depth". Trouser Press later called it the band's "finest work" and "their most raging, abrasive, pulverizing record".

When asked by The Guardian to name his top 20 albums, John Peel included Songs about Fucking as his fifteenth favourite album. Robert Plant claimed that the album had made him "an Albini fan," and Albini went on to be the recording engineer for the Page and Plant album Walking into Clarksdale (1998).

In Gimme Indie Rock, Andrew Earles said that the album is "a certifiably essential part of any record collection, especially those that trod in indie rock's heavier paths." He credited the album with having an influence on the "aggro" and post-hardcore oriented sect of the underground rock movement.

=== Accolades ===
Publication	Country	Accolade	Rank
Pitchfork	US	"The Top 100 Albums of the 1980s"	54
Pitchfork	US	"The 200 Best Albums of the 1980s"	135
Beats Per Minute	US	"The Top 100 Albums of the 1980s"	47
Terrorizer	UK	"Terrorizer Albums of the Eighties"	-
The Guardian	UK	"1000 Albums to Hear Before You Die"	-
NME	UK	"The 50 Albums That Built Punk"	33
Rockdelux	Spain	"The 100 Best Albums of the 1980s"	39
Rockdelux	Spain	"The 200 Best Albums of All Time"	99
Rockdelux	Spain	"300 Best Albums from 1984-2014"	136

== Track listing ==
All tracks are written by Big Black, except where noted.

Side Happy Otter
No.	Title	Writer(s)	Length
1.	"The Power of Independent Trucking"		1:27
2.	"The Model"	Karl Bartos, Ralf Hütter, Emil Schult	2:34
3.	"Bad Penny"		2:33
4.	"L Dopa"		1:40
5.	"Precious Thing"		2:20
6.	"Colombian Necktie"		2:14

Side Sad Otter
No.	Title	Length
7.	"Kitty Empire"	4:01
8.	"Ergot"	2:27
9.	"Kasimir S. Pulaski Day"	2:28
10.	"Fish Fry"	2:06
11.	"Pavement Saw"	2:12
12.	"Tiny, King of the Jews"	2:31
13.	"Bombastic Intro"	0:35

CD bonus track
No.	Title	Writer(s)	Length
14.	"He's a Whore"	Rick Nielsen	2:37

== Personnel ==
- Steve Albini – guitar, vocals
- Santiago Durango (credited as Melvin Belli) – guitar
- Dave Riley – bass guitar
- "Roland" (an E-mu Drumulator drum machine) – drums
- John Loder – recording engineer (Happy Otter side only)
