= Malachi Ritscher =

American musician

- Born: January 13, 1954; Dickinson, North Dakota, U.S.
- Died: November 3, 2006 (aged 52); Chicago, Illinois, U.S.
- Cause of death: Self-immolation
- Known for: Musician and Self-immolation protest against the war in Iraq
- Children: 1

Malachi Ritscher (Mark David Ritscher; January 13, 1954 – November 3, 2006) was an American musician, recording engineer, human rights activist, and anti-war protester. He died by self-immolation, an act of protest against the 2003 invasion of Iraq.

== Biography ==
Mark David Ritscher was born in Dickinson, North Dakota on January 13, 1954. Ritscher and his family moved around the United States until 1969, when they moved to Lincoln, Nebraska, where he attended high school. Ritscher married at age 17, had a son named Malachi, and after almost ten years, divorced. In 1981 Ritscher moved to Chicago and adopted the name Malachi for himself. He played bass on a 1988 EP by Arsenal, a recording project of Big Black guitarist Santiago Durango. (The credit on the EP reads "Malachi Richter".) In the 1990s he became a fixture on Chicago's jazz and experimental music scenes, attending and recording many performances. Ritscher, after recording a live concert, would offer his high-quality recording to the musicians at little or no cost. Many of these recordings have seen official release. Near the end of his life Ritscher traveled extensively. He also developed a strong commitment to anti-war issues; Chicago police arrested him twice at anti-war protests.

=== Suicide ===
Ritscher's self-immolation took place on the side of the Kennedy Expressway near downtown Chicago during the morning rush hour of Friday, November 3, 2006. In a suicide letter published on his website, he described at length his political convictions as to the Iraq War and his choice to take his own life, writing, "if I am required to pay for your barbaric war, I choose not to live in your world."

=== Reaction to death ===
Ritscher's self-immolation went unremarked by the media for nearly a week. It was condemned by Chicago Sun-Times columnist Richard Roeper, who thought that his suicide was a pointless act. Regarding Ritscher's suicide, Roeper stated, "With all great respect, if he thought setting himself on fire and ending his life in Chicago would change anyone's mind about the war in Iraq, his last gesture on this planet was his saddest and his most futile." Ritscher's son described his father as a recovering alcoholic who fought with depression. Other members of Ritscher's family instead believed that Ritscher killed himself to shock an apathetic public into action against the war and world oppression.

Ritscher himself gave detailed reasons for his suicide: "My position is that I only get one death, I want it to be a good one. Wouldn't it be better to stand for something or make a statement, rather than a fiery collision with some drunk driver? Are not smokers choosing death by lung cancer? Where is the dignity there? Are not the people who disregard the environment killing themselves and future generations?" In his self-penned obituary he confessed to feeling guilty for not killing Defense Secretary Donald Rumsfeld when he had the chance.

Ska-punk band Less Than Jake wrote a song about Ritscher's death titled "Malachi Richter's Liquor's Quicker" for their 2008 album GNV FLA. Ritscher's name was intentionally misspelled as Richter in reference to his credit on the 1988 Arsenal EP he'd played bass on which his name had been similarly misspelled. The opening of the song includes the reading of an excerpt from his suicide note with Morse code underneath that says "We may lose hope but there’s always hope."

David Lester, guitarist in Mecca Normal, designed a poster of Malachi as one of his Inspired Agitator series in 2008. Mecca Normal recorded a song in 2010 called "Malachi" for a 7" on K Records. The song was engineered by Calvin Johnson.

The section "Objection: "Compositions/Improvisations" in the 2011 book Howell by poet Tyrone Williams features poems whose titles are also the titles of live jazz albums recorded by Ritscher, and is dedicated to Ritscher. The section also quotes Ritscher's suicide note in full, and mentions Thich Quang Duc.

== See also ==
- List of political self-immolations
- Thich Quang Duc
- Aaron Bushnell
- Mohamed Bouazizi
- Daniel V. Jones, American man with HIV who shot himself on a freeway in protest of HMOs.
