= Sound of Impact =

1987 live album by Big Black

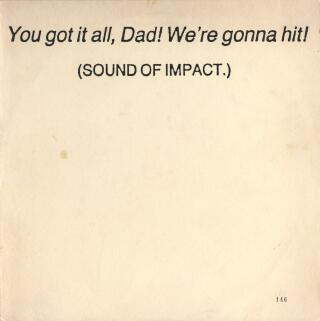

Live album by Big Black
- Released: 1987
- Genres: Noise rock; post-hardcore
- Length: 50:51
- Label: Blast First
- Producer: Big Black

Big Black chronology
The Hammer Party (1986)	Sound of Impact (1987)	Headache (1987)

Professional ratings
Review scores
Source	Rating
AllMusic	3.5/5 stars
The Encyclopedia of Popular Music	2/5 stars
Sounds	5/5 stars

Sound of Impact, also known as You Got It All, Dad! We're Gonna Hit! (Sound of Impact.), (Note: A quote from the cockpit voice recording of North Central Airlines Flight 458.) is a live album by the American post-hardcore band Big Black. It was released in limited edition in 1987. The band did not include its name anywhere on the album.

== Critical reception ==
Alternative Rock wrote that the album captured a "typically brutal" live performance.

== Track listing ==
1. "Ready Men"
2. "Big Money"
3. "Pigeon Kill"
4. "Passing Complexion"
5. "Crack Up"
6. "RIP"
7. "Jordan, Minnesota"
8. "Steelworker (Short Fragment)"
9. "Cables"
10. "Pigeon Kill"
11. "Kerosene"
12. "Bad Penny"
13. "Deep Six"
14. "RIP"
15. "Rema Rema"

== Personnel ==
- Dave Riley: Bass Guitar
- Santiago Durango: Guitar, Backing Vocals
- Steve Albini: Guitar, Vocals
- Roland: Drums
