= Bulldozer (EP) =

1983 EP by Big Black

EP by Big Black
- Released: 1983
- Recorded: 1983
- Genre: Noise rock; post-hardcore
- Length: 15:36
- Label: Ruthless, Fever Records, Touch and Go
- Producer: Iain Burgess

Big Black chronology
Lungs (1982)	Bulldozer (1983)	Racer-X (1985)

Steel Sleeve from first 200 copies

Professional ratings
Review scores
Source	Rating
AllMusic	3/5 stars
Rolling Stone	3/5 stars

Bulldozer is the second EP by American punk rock band Big Black, released in 1983. It was their first release to feature an actual band performing, including Pat Byrne from Urge Overkill playing drums on some of the songs in addition to the Roland TR-606 drum machine that provided rhythm tracks on Big Black's first two records.

On Bulldozer, Big Black's founder and frontman Steve Albini achieved a signature "clanky" sound with his guitar by using metal guitar picks notched with sheet metal clips, creating the effect of two guitar picks at once. The Bulldozer EP was recorded with engineer Iain Burgess and released in December 1983, with the first two hundred copies packaged in a galvanized sheet metal sleeve in homage to Public Image Ltd.'s Metal Box. Many of the EP's lyrics depicted scenarios drawn from Albini's rural upbringing, such as "Cables", which described the slaughtering of cows at a Montana abattoir, and "Pigeon Kill", about a rural Indiana town that dealt with an overpopulation of pigeons by feeding them poisoned corn. The EP's final song, "Jump the Climb," was recorded by Albini before the addition of his bandmates.

Albini originally named the EP Hey Nigger because "anyone stupid enough to be offended by that title is part of the problem... It's better to be confrontational about things like this. Of course I think judging people by the color of their skin is absurd." However, his bandmates made him change the title.

Bulldozer was later compiled with Big Black's earlier six-song EP Lungs on the 1986 LP The Hammer Party. The CD version also included Big Black's follow-up EP, Racer-X.

== Track listing ==
1. "Cables" - 2:40
2. "Pigeon Kill" - 1:47
3. "I'm a Mess" - 1:56
4. "Texas" - 4:02
5. "Seth" - 3:32
6. "Jump the Climb" - 2:59

== Personnel ==
- Jeff Pezzati - bass guitar
- Santiago Durango - "smash" guitar
- Steve Albini - "klang" guitar, vocals
- Roland - Roland TR-606 drum machine
- Pat Byrne - drums (all tracks except "Jump the Climb")
