= Kathryn Lukas =

American musician (1945–2025)

Kathryn Lukas (1945–2025) was a contemporary flute performer and teacher, familiarly known as Kate Lukas. She was a Professor of Music (Flute) at the Jacobs School of Music at Indiana University from 1990 until her retirement in 2024. She has taught at the Guildhall School of Music and recorded contemporary flute repertoire for the BBC. As a member of the Ensemble Dreamtiger, which included cellist Rohan de Saram, pianist (now Professor) Peter Hill, and pianist / composer Douglas Young, Kathryn Lukas recorded East-West Encounters for Cameo Classics. This CD is now distributed by Nimbus Records. Lukas played flute on English punk band Wire's song "Strange", which featured on their 1977 album Pink Flag. She also played flute on "Heartbeat" from their 1978 album Chairs Missing. She was the former principal flute of the Santa Fe Opera Company and had also played as a guest flutist with the Chicago Symphony Orchestra, as well as with the English Chamber Orchestra, the Academy of St Martin in the Fields, the London Symphony Orchestra and the Royal Opera House.
