= Arsenal (American band) =

American indie rock band

- Genres: Indie rock; punk rock
- Years active: 1988–1990
- Label: Touch and Go
- Spinoff of: Big Black
- Past members: Santiago Durango; Malachi Ritscher; Pierre Kezdy

Arsenal was an American indie rock band, formed by the former Big Black guitarist Santiago Durango, after Big Black broke up. Durango was in law school at the time. Arsenal featured similar characteristics to Big Black (drum machine, noisy guitar etc.) but a much less abrasive sound, mainly due to the addition of a melodic keyboard sound on certain songs.

For the first record, Santiago asked bassist Malachi Ritscher to play for him, resulting in the self-produced, four-song EP, Manipulator, released on Touch and Go Records in 1988.

At this time they also appeared on Blast First's Nothing Short of Total War compilation album, with the song "Little Hitlers". –

Then, in 1990, with bassist Pierre Kezdy (Naked Raygun), Arsenal released a second EP, a 12-inch 45 rpm vinyl disc, titled Factory Smog Is a Sign of Progress, also on Touch and Go Records.

== Discography ==
=== EPs ===
- Manipulator (Touch and Go Records/Blast First) (1988)
- Factory Smog Is a Sign of Progress (Touch and Go Records) (1990)
