= The Rich Man's Eight Track Tape =

1987 compilation album by Big Black

Compilation album by Big Black
- Released: 1987
- Recorded: 1985–1987
- Genre: Punk rock
- Length: 52:17
- Label: Homestead

Big Black chronology
Headache (1987)	The Rich Man's Eight Track Tape (1987)	Songs About Fucking (1987)

The Rich Man's Eight Track Tape is an album by American punk rock band Big Black. It was released in 1987 by Touch and Go Records. The album is a CD compilation of Big Black's Atomizer album (minus the song "Strange Things"), "Heartbeat" single and Headache EP. Atomizer is pictured on the cover artwork as an eight-track tape playing in a Panasonic TNT portable player.

The title of the album, and the liner notes by Steve Albini, show the band's low regard for compact discs, drawing parallels between CD and the 8-track tape of 1970s, preferring to release all of their material on vinyl LP records.

== Reception ==
AllMusic called it "an indispensable compilation" and gave it a rating of 4.5 out of 5.

Professional ratings
Review scores
Source	Rating
AllMusic	4.5/5 stars
Rolling Stone	4.5/5 stars

== Track listing ==
All songs written by Big Black, except where noted.

1. "Jordan, Minnesota" - 3:20
2. "Passing Complexion" - 3:04
3. "Big Money" - 2:29
4. "Kerosene" - 6:05
5. "Bad Houses" - 3:09
6. "Fists of Love" - 4:21
7. "Stinking Drunk" - 3:27
8. "Bazooka Joe" - 4:43
9. "Cables (live)" - 3:09
10. "Heartbeat" (Colin Newman) - 3:48
11. "Things to Do Today" - 1:44
12. "I Can't Believe" - 1:03
13. "My Disco" - 2:52
14. "Grinder" - 2:23
15. "Ready Men" - 3:51
16. "Pete, King of the Detectives" - 2:42

"Heartbeat" is a cover of the Wire song.
