= Racer-X =

1984 EP by Big Black

EP by Big Black
- Released: March 10, 1985
- Recorded: 1984
- Genre: Noise rock, post-hardcore
- Length: 15:36
- Label: Homestead, Touch and Go

Big Black chronology
Bulldozer (1983)	Racer-X (1985)	Atomizer (1986)

1992 reissue

Professional ratings
Review scores
Source	Rating
AllMusic	4/5 stars
Christgau's Record Guide	A−
The New Rolling Stone Album Guide	4/5 stars
Tom Hull	B+

Racer-X is the third EP by American post-hardcore band Big Black. It was released by Homestead Records on March 10, 1985 and reissued by Touch and Go Records in 1992.

Racer-X was the first of Big Black's recordings to cement their instrumental lineup of two guitarists, one bassist, and an E-mu Drumulator drum machine. It was the final Big Black release to feature bassist Jeff Pezzati, who left to dedicate more time to his primary band Naked Raygun.

== Title ==
Racer X was a character on the anime series Speed Racer. The EP's title track makes numerous references to the original TV show.

== Single ==
The song "Il Duce" (about Benito Mussolini) was recorded in the same session as the songs from the Racer-X EP. The song was released the same year as a 7" single backed with "Big Money" from Atomizer. Homestead records also issued a promotional 12" version of the single with "Il Duce" and "Big Money" on the A-side and three live tracks on the B-side.

== Cover art ==
The original EP featured cover art by Nate Kaatrud (better known as National Kato/Nash Kato) of Urge Overkill. When Touch and Go reissued the EP in 1992, the original artwork could not be found and a new cover was produced.

== Track listing ==
1. "Racer-X" - 4:01
2. "Shotgun" - 3:28
3. "The Ugly American" - 2:41
4. "Deep Six" - 3:14
5. "Sleep!" - 2:42
6. "The Big Payback" (James Brown) - 2:29

== Personnel ==
- Steve Albini: electric guitar, vocals
- Santiago Durango: electric guitar
- Jeff Pezzati: bass guitar
- Roland: drum machine
- John Bonhen: saxophone on "The Ugly American"

Recorded by Iain Burgess in Chicago.

== Influence ==
The Japandroids covered "Racer-X" during their Dec 15, 2009 Daytrotter session. Of “Racer X” they say this:

We’re recording a 7-inch in January and this going to be the B-side. This song was originally done by Big Black and came out on the Racer-X EP in 1984. Our version is pretty good, but the original is a masterpiece.
