= Lungs (EP) =

1982 EP by Big Black

EP by Big Black
- Released: 1982
- Recorded: 1981
- Genre: Punk rock; noise rock; industrial rock
- Length: 20:47
- Label: Ruthless, Touch and Go

Big Black chronology
| Lungs (1982) | Bulldozer (1983) |

Professional ratings
Review scores
| Source | Rating |
|---|---|
| AllMusic | 3/5 stars |
| Rolling Stone | 3/5 stars |

Lungs is the first EP by American punk rock band Big Black. It was released in December 1982 on Ruthless Records and was reissued in 1992 on Touch and Go Records. A 19-year-old Steve Albini played nearly every instrument on Lungs, with "sax bleats" by Albini's college friend John Bohnen and drums being handled by "Roland," a drum machine that was credited as a member of the band. The EP was used to recruit the other members of Big Black. Lungs was recorded on a TEAC 3340 loaned to Albini in exchange for a case of beer.

The original EP came with an array of objects, including loaded squirt guns, bloody pieces of paper (one of Albini's friends suffered from a nosebleed), dollar bills, condoms, concert tickets, Bruce Lee trading cards, pictures of old people and firecrackers. Things like fishhooks and razorblades were discontinued, fearing lawsuits.

== Track listing ==
All songs written by Steve Albini.

1. "Steelworker" – 4:15
2. "Live in a Hole" – 3:01
3. "Dead Billy" – 3:28
4. "I Can Be Killed" – 4:28
5. "Crack" – 3:55
6. "Rip" – 2:21
