= Ruthless Records (Chicago) =

Record label from Chicago

- Steelworker logo used on almost every Ruthless Records release
- Founded: 1981
- Founder: John Kezdy; Jon Babbin
- Defunct: 1990
- Genre: Punk rock, noise rock
- Country of origin: United States
- Location: Chicago, Illinois

Ruthless Records was the name of a Chicago punk record label. Founded in 1981 by the Effigies, it was not a real business, but a name used by Chicago and Minneapolis punk bands from 1981 to 1990: Big Black, the Effigies, End Result, Naked Raygun, Rifle Sport and Urge Overkill. The Effigies operated the label from its creation in 1981 until 1984, when they found the label to be distracting from their priorities with the band. They handed the label over to Big Black founder Steve Albini, who ran the label until it dissolved in 1990.

Ruthless Records was an independent label run as a cooperative by Jon Babbin (later founder of Criminal IQ Records), The Effigies, Naked Raygun and Steve Albini of Big Black fame. After the release of The Effigies' Haunted Town EP, frontman John Kezdy was dissatisfied with the way Autumn Records handled their expenses and decided to start the label with Babbin. Naked Raygun and Big Black came on board shortly after and all three acts worked together to get their initial records released. It wasn't really a company or anything of that sort, just a way for these bands to get their records out. The bands themselves were pretty much responsible for the creation and costs of their own records; Ruthless was just a central name/address to give the appearance of a record company to join like-minded bands.

The latter half of Ruthless' existence (from about 1985 on) was run almost exclusively by Steve Albini and most of the releases were by bands outside Chicago. The label ended around 1990.

== Roster ==
- Appliances SFB
- Big Black
- Black Spot
- Brick Layer Cake
- Circle Seven
- Dark Arts
- Dig Dat Hole
- The Effigies
- End Result
- Naked Raygun
- Primos
- Rifle Sport
- Urge Overkill

== Label discography ==
- Effigies – "Bodybag"/"Security" 7", 1982
- Big Black – Lungs EP, (RRBB02, December 1982)
- Effigies – We're Da Machine EP, (E1003, 1983)
- Circle Seven – Suburban Hope 12" (1000, 1983)
- Naked Raygun – Basement Screams 12", (03, 1983)
- Naked Raygun – Flammable Solid 7", (311057, 1983)
- Big Black – Bulldozer EP, (RRBB07, December 1983)
- Big Black – Live Cassette, (Recorded at 950, November 1983)
- Effigies – For Ever Grounded LP, (1984)
- Effigies – Haunted Town 12", (1984 Re-release)
- Effigies – Fly on a Wire LP, (1985)
- End Result – Ward EP, (1985)
- Rifle Sport – "Plan 39"/"Dub" (RRRS-013, 1985)
- Rifle Sport – "Complex EP" (RRRS-014, 1985)
- Urge Overkill – Strange, I 12" (1986)
- Dark Arts – Long Way From Brigadoon 12" (1986)
- Appliances sfb – "Them"/"Green Door" (1987)
- Rifle Sport – White (Made in France) LP (1987)
- Black Spot – Burn LP (1989)
- Rifle Sport – Live at the Entry, Dead at the Exit LP/CD (1989)
- Brick Layer Cake – Eye For An Eye, Tooth For A Tooth 12" (1990)
- Rifle Sport – Primo (Big Money-Ruthless BMI-011, 1991)
- Rifle Sport – "Little Drummer Boy"/"Shanghaied" (Big Money-Ruthless BMI-012, 1991)

== See also ==
- List of record labels
- Chicago Record Labels
