= Heartbeat (Wire song) =

Song by Wire

from the album Chairs Missing
- Released: August 1978
- Recorded: 1978
- Genre: Post-punk; post-rock
- Length: 3:16
- Label: Harvest
- Songwriter: Colin Newman
- Producer: Mike Thorne

"Heartbeat" is a song written by Colin Newman and originally recorded and released in 1978 by the English rock band Wire on their second album Chairs Missing. Guest Kate Lukas played flute on the track.

The song was not uncommon as either an opener or a closer of Wire's live sets at the time. Producer Mike Thorne has called it the band's "first overt love song". However, in actuality, the lyrics appear to describe an individual in a darkened room, possibly an anechoic chamber, who becomes entranced by the sounds of their own vital signs.

== Big Black version ==
"Heartbeat"

Single by Big Black
- Released: 1987
- Genre: Noise punk, noise rock
- Label: Touch and Go
- Songwriter: Colin Newman

Big Black singles chronology
"Il Duce" (1985)	"Heartbeat" (1987)	"He's a Whore/The Model" (1987)

"Heartbeat" was covered and released as a single in 1987 by Chicago post-hardcore band Big Black. Apart from the Wire cover, the other two tracks on the record are originals. This 7" record was sold together with the Headache EP or used for promotional give-aways. The three tracks were eventually reissued on The Rich Man's Eight Track Tape compilation.

=== Track listing ===
All tracks are written by Big Black, except where noted.

No.	Title	Length
1.	"Heartbeat" (Colin Newman)	3:49
2.	"Things To Do Today"	1:47
3.	"I Can't Believe"	1:05
Total length:		6:31
