= Big Black =

American punk rock band

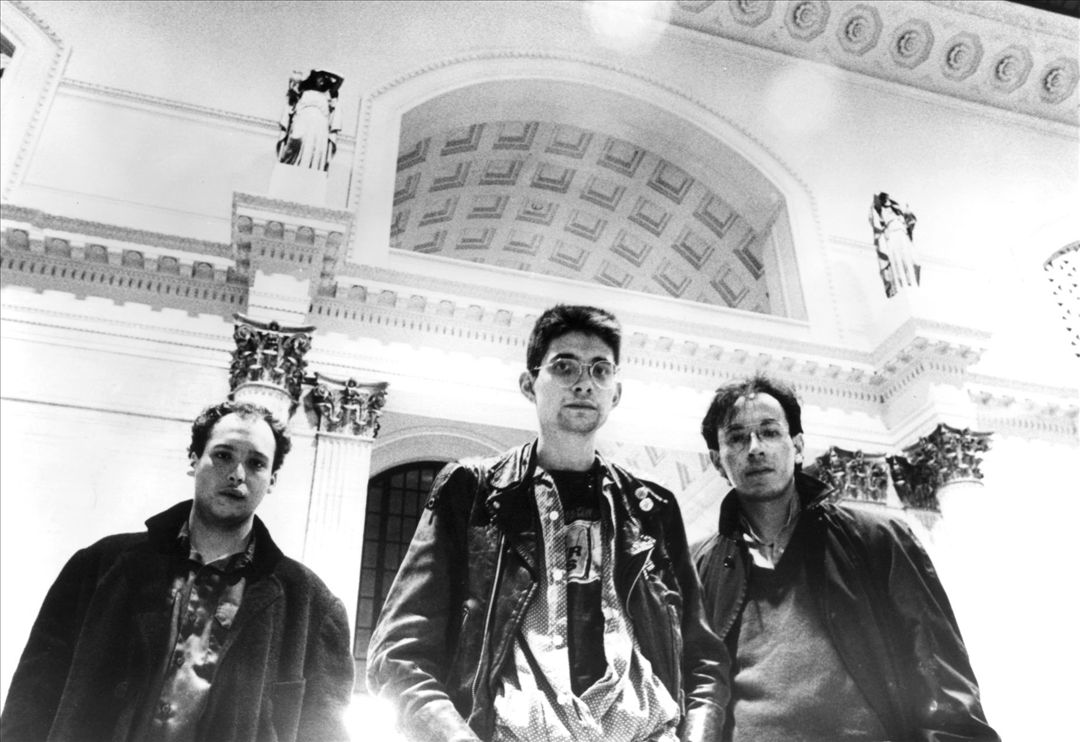
- Big Black at Chicago's Union Station in 1986; left to right: Riley, Albini, and Durango

Background information
- Origin: Evanston, Illinois, U.S.
- Genres: Punk rock; noise rock; post-punk; industrial rock; post-hardcore
- Years active: 1981–1987; 2006
- Labels: Ruthless; Fever; Homestead; Blast First; Touch and Go
- Past members: Steve Albini; Jeff Pezzati; Santiago Durango; Dave Riley

Big Black was an American punk rock band from Evanston, Illinois, active from 1981 to 1987. Founded first as a solo project by singer and guitarist Steve Albini, the band became a trio with an initial lineup that included guitarist Santiago Durango and bassist Jeff Pezzati, both of Naked Raygun. In 1985, Pezzati was replaced by Dave Riley, who played on Big Black's two full-length studio albums, Atomizer (1986) and Songs About Fucking (1987).

Big Black's aggressive and abrasive music was characterized by distinctively clanky guitars and the use of a drum machine rather than a drum kit, elements that foreshadowed industrial rock. The band's lyrics flouted commonly held taboos and dealt frankly—and often explicitly—with politically and culturally loaded topics including murder, rape, child sexual abuse, arson, racism, and misogyny. Though the band's lyrics contained controversial material, the lyrics were meant to serve as a commentary or a display of distaste for the subject matter. They were staunchly critical of the commercial nature of rock, shunning the mainstream music industry and insisting on complete control over all aspects of their career. At the height of their success, they booked their own tours, paid for their own recordings, refused to sign contracts, and eschewed many of the traditional corporate trappings of rock bands. In doing so, they had a significant impact on the aesthetic and political development of independent and underground rock music.

In addition to two studio albums, Big Black released two live albums, two compilation albums, four EPs, and five singles, all through independent record labels. Most of the band's catalog was kept in print through Touch and Go Records for years following their breakup.

== History ==
=== 1981–1982: Formation and Lungs ===
Big Black was founded by Steve Albini in 1981 during his second year of college at Northwestern University. Albini had become a fan of punk rock during his high school years in Missoula, Montana, and taught himself to play bass guitar in the fall of 1979, his senior year, while recuperating from a badly broken leg resulting from being struck by a car while riding his motorcycle. Moving to Evanston, Illinois the following year to pursue a journalism degree and fine art minor at Northwestern, Albini immersed himself in the fledgling Chicago punk scene and became a devoted fan of the band Naked Raygun. He also DJ'd for the campus radio station, from which he was repeatedly fired for playing loud and abrasive music during the morning time slot as well as not completing the required logs. He also wrote a controversial column titled "Tired of Ugly Fat?" for the Chicago zine Matter, publishing confrontational rants about the local music scene which polarized readers into either respecting or hating him.

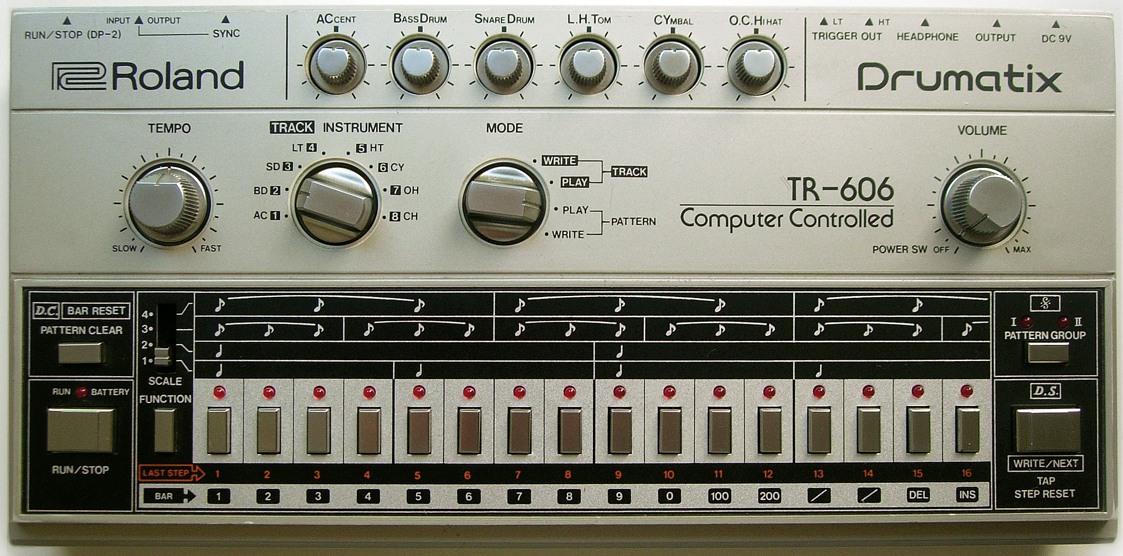
A Roland TR-606 drum machine, the model Albini used to create Big Black's early drum sound

Albini began playing in college bands, including a short-lived "arty new wave" act called Stations that featured a drum machine. Seeing the advantage in a machine that could play incredibly fast without tiring, always kept a steady beat, and would follow commands exactly, he purchased a Roland TR-606 drum machine and began writing what would become the first Big Black songs. However, he was unable to find other musicians who could play the songs to his satisfaction, later stating in Forced Exposure that "I couldn't find anybody who didn't blow out of a pig's asshole." Instead, in the spring of 1981, he bought a guitar, borrowed a four-track multitrack recorder from a friend in exchange for a case of beer, and spent his spring break week recording the Lungs EP in his living room, handling the guitar, bass, and vocals by himself and programming the Roland TR-606 to provide the drum sound. Albini would come to dislike the album, regarding it as too "slavishly imitative" of personal favorites like the Cure, Killing Joke, and Cabaret Voltaire. The EP is described by Our Band Could Be Your Life author Michael Azerrad as "cold, dark, and resolutely unlistenable", with the lyrics describing child abusers and other controversial topics.

Albini named his new musical project Big Black, calling the moniker "just sort of a reduction of the concept of a large, scary, ominous figure. All the historical images of fear and all the things that kids are afraid of are all big and black, basically." He used the Lungs tape to try to enlist other musicians to the project, briefly recruiting Minor Threat guitarist Lyle Preslar who was attending Northwestern, but the two proved incompatible as musicians. Albini passed Lungs on to John Babbin of the small local label Ruthless Records, who released 1,500 copies of the EP in December 1982 with random objects such as dollar bills, used condoms, photographs of Bruce Lee, and bloody pieces of paper thrown into the inserts.

=== 1983: Full lineup and Bulldozer ===
In early 1983 Albini met Naked Raygun singer Jeff Pezzati through mutual friends and convinced him to play bass guitar with Big Black. Pezzati recalled that Albini "knew a heck of a lot about, right from the start, how to release a record and get the word out that you have a record", and that "He jumped at the chance to have a band play his stuff." The two practiced in Pezzati's basement, and one day Naked Raygun guitarist Santiago Durango came downstairs and asked to play along. The trio clicked as a unit, Durango's ability to rework arrangements and tweak sounds helping to refine Albini's song ideas. According to Albini, "He ended up being absolutely crucial to Big Black."

Albini "sorta conned" small local label Fever Records into financing the next Big Black EP, bringing in drummer Pat Byrne of Urge Overkill to play on the sessions as accompaniment to the drum machine, which they dubbed "Roland" for album credits. Albini achieved a signature "clanky" sound with his guitar by using metal guitar picks notched with sheet metal clips, creating the effect of two guitar picks at once. The Bulldozer EP was recorded with engineer Iain Burgess and released in December 1983, with the first two hundred copies packaged in a galvanized sheet metal sleeve in homage to Public Image Ltd.'s Metal Box. Many of the EP's lyrics depicted scenarios drawn from Albini's rural upbringing, such as "Cables", which described the slaughtering of cows at a Montana abattoir, and "Pigeon Kill", about a rural Indiana town that dealt with an overpopulation of pigeons by feeding them poisoned corn.

=== 1984: Touring and label signing ===
Even with Bulldozer released, Big Black drew very small crowds in their native Chicago. They began venturing outside of Illinois to play shows in Madison, Minneapolis, Detroit, and Muncie, transporting themselves and their equipment in a cramped car and sleeping on people's floors. Albini handled much of the band's logistics himself, setting up rehearsals, booking studio time, and arranging tours. With their reputation growing through small tours, he was able to set up a run of East Coast dates including performances in Washington, D.C., and Boston and at New York City's Danceteria, followed by a European tour on which they won acclaim in the United Kingdom's music press. Big Black simultaneously found themselves gaining popularity in their hometown, but felt embittered that the same locals who had snubbed them just months before were suddenly interested now that they had built a reputation outside the city, and the band actually refused to play in Chicago for some time.

Part of Big Black's local unpopularity stemmed from Albini and the vitriol he regularly directed at Chicago's rock scene: by 1985, the Metro Chicago was the only club in the city that was booking punk rock shows and was also large enough to accommodate Big Black, but after performing there Albini badmouthed the club in an interview and found himself banned from it permanently. Compounding the problem were the band's aggressive, noise-driven sound and Albini's confrontational lyrics, which tested the tolerance of his white liberal audience by mercilessly satirizing racism, sexism, chauvinism, and stereotypes of homosexuality, sometimes using pejoratives like "darkie" and "fag" to drive home the point; this led some listeners to consider him a bigot.

It meant nothing to us if we were popular or not, or if we sold either a million or no records, so we were invulnerable to ploys by music scene weasels to get us to make mistakes in the name of success. To us, every moment we remained unfettered and in control was a success. We never had a manager. We never had a booking agent. We never had a lawyer. We never took an advance from a record company. We booked our own tours, paid our own bills, made our own mistakes and never had anybody shield us from either the truth or the consequences. The results of that methodology speak for themselves: Nobody ever told us what to do, and nobody took any of our money.

— Steve Albini

Looking for better distribution of their records, Big Black negotiated a deal with Homestead Records. Gerard Cosloy, who had befriended Albini through writing for Matter and gone on to work at Homestead, negotiated an unorthodox deal for the band: Big Black merely licensed their recordings to Homestead for specific lengths of time, rather than the label retaining the rights to the recordings as was typical. Further, the band took no advance payments, paid for their own recordings, and signed no contracts. Durango later remarked that "We came from a punk perspective—we did not want to get sucked into a corporate culture where basically you're signing a contract because you don't trust the other person to live up to their word. We had ideals, and that was one of our ideals." The band members figured that if a record company were going to cheat them, they would be able to do so with or without a contract because the band could not afford to defend themselves.

Albini believed that Big Black had nothing to gain by adopting the usual corporate trappings of rock bands: "If you don't use contracts, you don't have any contracts to worry about. If you don't have a tour rider, you don't have a tour rider to argue about. If you don't have a booking agent, you don't have a booking agent to argue with." Handling the tour booking, equipment hauling, setup, and breakdown of shows themselves also meant that the band did not have to hire a booking agent or road crew with whom they would have to share profits. The lack of a drummer also meant one less member to split profits with, and since there was no drum kit the band did not have to rent a tour van to fit all of their equipment. Thus Big Black was able to profit from most of their tours. They embarked on a 1984 national tour of the United States in preparation for their forthcoming Homestead EP, utilizing the close-knit network of independent rock bands to learn of cities and venues to play.

=== 1985–1986: Racer-X and Atomizer ===
In late 1984, following the recording of the Racer-X EP, Pezzati amicably left the band due to his increasingly demanding job, the need to devote time to his fiancée, and the increasing popularity and busy schedule of Naked Raygun, of which he was still a member. Durango, meanwhile, opted to leave Naked Raygun to commit full-time to Big Black. Pezzati was replaced by Dave Riley, who joined Big Black the week of Racer-X's release in April 1985. Riley had moved to Chicago in 1982 from Detroit, where he had worked at a studio where funk artists George Clinton and Sly Stone had recorded (he is credited as a recording engineer on Parliament's Trombipulation and Funkadelic's The Electric Spanking of War Babies). In Chicago he joined a band called Savage Beliefs, and his playing style impressed Albini and Durango, who invited him to join Big Black as they were recording the songs that would make up the band's first full-length album.

Albini claimed to be aiming for a "big, massive, slick rock sound" with Racer-X, which was less frantic than Bulldozer, but ultimately felt that the EP was "too samey and monolithic." The band had already begun writing new songs by the time Racer-X was released, stating in the last sentence of the EP's liner notes that "The next one's gonna make you shit your pants." Big Black's first LP, 1986's Atomizer, found the band at their most musically developed and aggressive level yet. Riley's funk background brought a slightly greater sense of melody and danceability to the band, while Albini and Durango's guitar work was more violent than ever before. Michael Azerrad comments that "by this time Big Black had both refined the ideas first suggested on Lungs and exploded them into something much huger than anyone but Albini had ever imagined", while Mark Deming of Allmusic states that the album "upped the ante on the musical and lyrical ferocity of Big Black's previous body of work, an unrelenting assault of guitar sounds and imagined violence of all sorts." Albini later remarked that "we just had a higher-than-average percentage of really good songs." The lyrics on Atomizer presented sociopaths committing evil acts that most people only sometimes contemplate: "Big Money" deals with a corrupt police officer, "Bazooka Joe" profiles a shell-shocked veteran who becomes a contract killer, "Stinking Drunk" describes a violent alcoholic, and "Fists of Love" presents a sadist. One of the album's most controversial songs was "Jordan, Minnesota", about the 1983 scandal in Jordan, Minnesota that saw a large number of the rural town's adults indicted on charges of involvement in a huge child sex ring.

"Kerosene", from Atomizer
"Kerosene" is cited by several critics as Big Black's peak; an "epically roaming track" with "guitars that sound like shattering glass".

"Kerosene", one of Atomizer's standout tracks, is viewed by both Azerrad and Allmusic's Andy Kellman as the band's peak performance. Azerrad remarks on its "powerful rhythm ripped straight from Gang of Four and guitars that sound like shattering glass", while Kellman calls it "undeniably Big Black's brightest/bleakest moment, an epically roaming track that features an instantly memorable guitar intro, completely incapable of being accurately described by vocal imitation or physical gesture [...] It's Big Black's 'Light My Fire,' literally." Riley explained that the song was about the effects of boredom in rural America: "There's only two things to do: Go blow up a whole load of stuff for fun, or have a lot of sex with the one girl in town who'll have sex with anyone. 'Kerosene' is about a guy who tries to combine the two pleasures."

Atomizer was a polarizing record that was praised in the national press and became an underground success, surpassing the band's expectations by selling three thousand copies soon after its release. Big Black secured a European distribution deal for their records through Blast First, a label recommended to Albini by Sonic Youth, and met enthusiastic responses to their shows on a 1986 European tour.

The compilation album The Hammer Party, combining Lungs and Bulldozer, was also released through Homestead Records in 1986, but later that year Big Black had a falling out with the label and its distributor, Dutch East India Trading. According to Albini, Dutch East India's accounting practices were "always fucked. They would do every sleazy, cheap trick to avoid paying you, like send you a check that wasn't signed or send you a check that had a different numeral and literal amount." Homestead then asked to make five hundred copies of a 12-inch single of "Il Duce" for free distribution to radio stations. The band agreed on the condition that the single was not to be offered for sale, since the song had already been released as a 7-inch single in 1985 and, according to Albini, "We didn't want our audience milked for extra money to buy an alternate format." A few weeks after the single's release, Albini began seeing copies for sale in record stores outside of Chicago. He soon found out that the 12-inch single was being sold both in the United States and abroad as a high-priced "collector's item". Though Homestead claimed not to be selling copies, Albini telephoned one of the label's salespeople posing as a record buyer and was told that they would sell him copies, but not in Chicago. As a result of the deception, Albini and Big Black severed ties with Homestead and Dutch East India. Though the band was receiving lucrative offers from major labels, they chose to remain independent and signed to Touch and Go Records, Albini being good friends with label head Corey Rusk.

=== 1987: Headache, Songs About Fucking, and breakup ===
Big Black's first release for Touch and Go was the Headache EP in spring 1987. The cover artwork for the limited original edition of the EP was a pair of forensic photos of an accident victim whose head had been split down the middle, and the record was packaged in a black plastic "body bag" to conceal the artwork from sensitive consumers. A sticker on the EP's cover read "Not as good as Atomizer, so don't get your hopes up, cheese!" According to Durango, "We didn't want to sit there and screw people. If we felt it wasn't as good, then we should just be honest about it." Indeed, Headache recycled many of the same sounds and themes found on Atomizer, showing signs that the band was lagging creatively. Durango later remarked that "I was feeling tapped out ideawise. At that point I think we had tried everything that we wanted to try, musically and in the studio."

The members of Big Black have often been asked why we chose to break up (the end of the band having been announced well in advance) just when we were becoming quite popular. The best answer then and now is: To prevent us from overstaying our welcome.

— Steve Albini

Tensions were also mounting within the band. Albini did not drink alcohol, so Riley and Durango became drinking buddies on the road while Albini was doing interviews and handling the band's logistics. Riley, however, was drinking to excess, and his behavior ruined several of the band's performances. During a key show at CBGB, he drunkenly smashed the drum machine. Albini also accused Riley of a number of other shortcomings including lateness to rehearsals, always needing rides, and "flashes of brilliance offset by flashes of belligerence." However, though he made a number of threats, Albini never fired Riley. Another problem facing the band was that Riley was now in college and both Albini and Durango had to keep day jobs, which limited Big Black's ability to tour. When Durango announced that he intended to enter law school beginning in the fall semester of 1987, the band decided to keep going until he began school and then call it quits. Despite enjoying increased press, radio airplay, record sales, and concert fees, the band did not regret their decision and eschewed the idea of commercial success. According to Riley, "Big Black was never about that. For Big Black to make any money, it wouldn't have been Big Black anymore." Being a lame duck band was also liberating, as the members no longer had to be concerned with the group's future. Albini wrote that he was happy to be breaking up the band before it grew too big:

I am now quite happy to be breaking up. Things getting much too big and uncontrollable. All along we've wanted to keep our hands on everything, so nothing happened that we didn't want to. With international and multi-format/multi-territorial shit, that's proving elusive. I prefer to cut it off rather than have it turn into another Gross Rock Spectacle.

With their breakup announced well in advance, Big Black recorded their final album, Songs About Fucking, half in London and half at Albini's home studio. Their final tours began in June 1987, taking them to Europe, the United Kingdom, Australia, and across the United States. They performed at the Pukkelpop festival in Belgium with Sonic Youth on July 22, Albini's 25th birthday. At a sold-out show in London for 1,300 people, Bruce Gilbert and Graham Lewis of Wire joined Big Black onstage to play an encore of Wire's "Heartbeat" (Big Black had released a cover version of the song as a single in conjunction with Headache). Albini wrote of the experience that "If I die right now it will all have been worth it." In the United States the band played in San Francisco, Providence, Boston, New York City, and Newport, Kentucky, concluding with their final performance on August 9, 1987, at the Georgetown Steam Plant in Seattle. At the end of this show the band smashed their instruments onstage.

Songs About Fucking was released shortly after the band's breakup and went on to become their most successful record, with an initial pressing of eight thousand copies. Mark Deming of Allmusic calls it "a scabrous masterpiece", while his colleague Andy Kellman states that "each [song] is incisive enough to render a razor as effective as a butter knife. In sum: yowl, ching, thump-thump-screech. Ugly characters line up in the songs like early arrivals at a monster truck rally." Critic Robert Christgau commented that "Anybody who thinks rock and roll is alive and well in the infinite variety of its garage-boy permutations had better figure out how these Hitler Youth rejects could crush the competition and quit simultaneously. No matter what well-meaning rockers think of Steve Albini's supremacist lies, they lie themselves if they dismiss what he does with electric guitars—that Killdozer sound culminates if not finishes off whole generations of punk and metal." Albini himself later considered the album's first side as Big Black's best output.

=== Post-Big Black ===
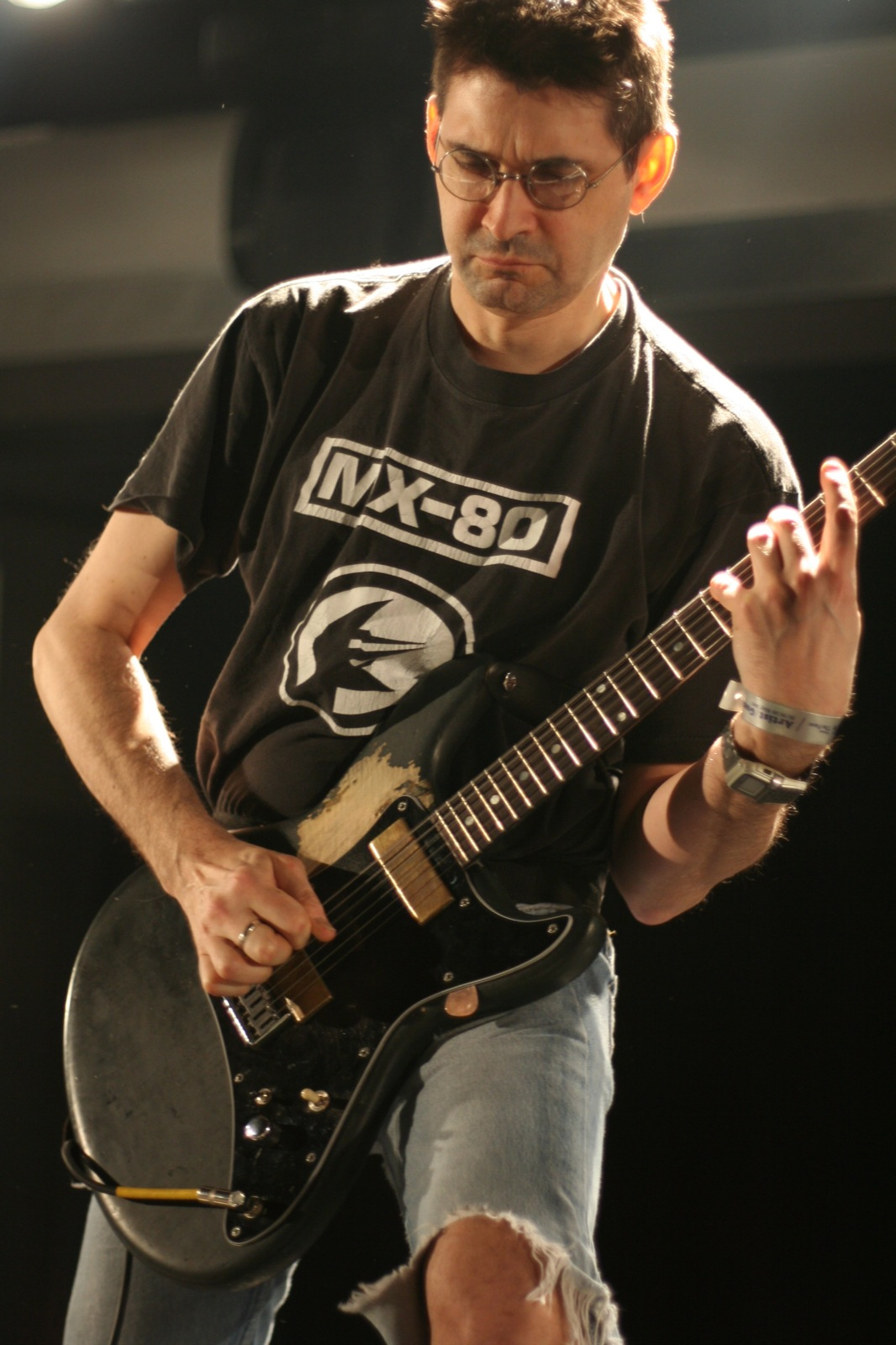
Steve Albini performing with Shellac in 2007

Following Big Black's breakup, Albini formed and fronted Rapeman from 1987 to 1989 and Shellac from 1992 until his death in 2024. He also began work as a recording engineer, working with artists such as Slint, the Pixies, the Breeders, Pegboy, Urge Overkill, the Jesus Lizard, the Wedding Present, Superchunk, PJ Harvey, Nirvana, Bush, and Page and Plant. Some of his most well-known recordings include the Pixies' Surfer Rosa (1988), Nirvana's In Utero (1993), Bush's Razorblade Suitcase (1996), and Page and Plant's Walking into Clarksdale (1998). In 1997 he opened his own recording studio, Electrical Audio, in Chicago. Albini's recording style was characterized by the use of vintage microphones placed strategically around the performance room, keeping vocals very low in the mix, and using few special effects. He was also known for recording almost any artist who requested his services (usually at very low rates for artists on independent labels but deliberately charging high amounts to artists on major record labels), disliking being credited on the albums he works on (insisting on being credited as a recording engineer rather than a producer, if at all), and refusing to take royalties for his work (calling them "an insult to the band").

Durango, meanwhile, continued to play music during his law school years, releasing two EPs on Touch and Go as Arsenal and recording with Boss Hog. He then became a practicing lawyer, with clients including Touch and Go Records and Cynthia Plaster Caster. Riley recorded tracks with the groups Algebra Suicide, Bull, and Flour before being incapacitated by a stroke in 1995, which was initially erroneously reported as a suicide attempt. Having lost the ability to walk, he authored a blog about his experiences titled "Worthless Goddamn Cripple". In 2004 he participated in a musical project called Miasma of Funk, releasing the album Groove on the Mania!, and in 2006 published the book Blurry and Disconnected: Tales of Sink-or-Swim Nihilism.

In 1992 Big Black's catalog reverted to Touch and Go Records, who re-released their entire discography and kept their records in print long after the band's breakup. That October the label released the live album and video Pigpile, recorded in London during the band's final tours, as well as the compilation album The Rich Man's Eight Track Tape, which combined tracks from Atomizer, Headache, and the "Heartbeat" single in compact disc format. The re-released version of The Hammer Party was expanded to include the tracks from Racer-X.

On September 9, 2006, Albini and Durango reunited with original bassist Jeff Pezzati for a Big Black reunion performance at Touch and Go's 25th Anniversary festival. Albini's touring schedule with Shellac did not allow time for the band to rehearse a full set, so they instead played a short set of four songs: "Cables", "Dead Billy", "Pigeon Kill", and "Racer-X". Albini explained that the performance was "not about Big Black wanting to get back together or even an audience wanting to see Big Black, it's that ... to not honor Touch and Go would be an insult by way of damning with faint praise", describing the label as "[not] just a benchmark for how a record label should behave, but how people should behave." During the performance he stated that "You can tell [this is] not something we had a burning desire to do, but we did it because we love Touch and Go [and] we love Corey Rusk [...] When history talks about rock music it has a tendency to skip from the Sex Pistols to Nirvana, [but] something started in the 1980s and you're seeing the evidence of it all around you", remarking that the label was "the best thing to happen to music in my lifetime, and we did this to say thanks". The performance prompted offers from promoters for further reunion shows, but Albini stated flatly "that is definitely not going to happen."

Riley died December 24, 2019, at the age of 59, from squamous cell carcinoma that began in his throat and spread to his lungs.

Albini died at age 61 on May 7, 2024, of a heart attack.

== Style ==
=== Music ===
Big Black's music challenged convention, pursuing an abrasive sound that was more aggressive than contemporary punk rock. Albini explained that the band strove for intensity, stating that their goal was to make "something that felt intense when we went through it, rather than something that had little coded indicators of intensity. Heavy metal and stuff like that didn't really seem intense to me, it seemed comical to me. Hardcore punk didn't really seem intense most of the time—most of the time it just seemed childish. I guess that's how I would differentiate what we were doing from what other people were doing." Both Albini and Riley described Big Black as a punk rock band. AllMusic has associated their sound with both hardcore and post-punk and described them as influential to indie rock as well as pioneers of noise rock and post-hardcore.

A major component of Big Black's music was the drum machine. Rather than attempt to make it emulate the sound of a normal drum kit, the band chose to exploit the idiosyncrasies of its synthetic sounds. On many songs Albini programmed it to accent the first and third beats of the bar, rather than the second and fourth beats typically accented in rock music. "The effect was a monolithic pummeling, an attack", says Michael Azerrad, "their groove, normally the most human aspect of a rock band, became its most inhuman; it only made them sound more insidious, its relentlessness downright tyrannical." On tour, the sound engineers at many rock clubs were befuddled by the drum machine, afraid that it would not work with their sound system or would blow out their speakers, and the band would have to coerce the club owner or threaten to cancel the show in order to get them to put the drum machine through the monitors.

The band's guitar sound was also unconventional. Albini was determined to avoid the "standard rock stud guitar sound", and achieved a signature "clanky" sound by using metal guitar picks notched by sheet metal snips; the notch causing the pick to hit each string twice, creating the effect of two simultaneous guitar picks. Durango remarked: "I always thought that our guitar playing was not so much playing guitars, but assembling noises created by guitars." He and Albini respectively billed their guitars as "vroom" and "skinng" in the liner notes for Atomizer. Mark Deming of AllMusic remarks that "The group's guitars alternately sliced like a machete and ground like a dentist's drill, creating a groundbreaking and monolithic dissonance in the process."

Big Black's music was influenced by a number of genres and artists. Albini was a fan of punk rock bands including Suicide, the Ramones, the Stooges, and Naked Raygun. When Riley joined the band in 1985 he brought with him a funk background, having worked at a Detroit studio where George Clinton and Sly Stone had recorded. During their career Big Black recorded cover versions of songs from a number of styles including post-punk, new wave, funk, hard rock, synthpop, and R&B; these included Rema-Rema's "Rema-Rema", James Brown's "The Payback", Wire's "Heartbeat", Cheap Trick's "He's a Whore", Kraftwerk's "The Model", and the Mary Jane Girls' "In My House". The sound that Big Black forged for themselves, however, was wholly original: Azerrad remarks that "the band's music—jagged, brutal, loud, and nasty—was original to a downright confrontational degree. Big Black distilled years of post-punk and hardcore down to a sound resembling a singing saw blade mercillesly tearing through sheet metal. No one had made records that sounded so harsh."

=== Lyrics ===
Big Black's songs explored the dark side of American culture in unforgiving detail, acknowledging no taboos. Albini's lyrics openly dealt with such topics as mutilation, murder, rape, child abuse, arson, immolation, racism, and misogyny. "That's just what was interesting to me as a postcollegiate bohemian", he later remarked. "We didn't have a manifesto. Nothing was off-limits; it's just that that's what came up most of the time." Many of his songs told miniature short stories of sociopaths doing evil things that the average person might merely contemplate. Some, such as "Cables", "Pigeon Kill", and "Jordan, Minnesota", were based on real events, or things that Albini had witnessed during his Montana upbringing. He compared the stories to Ripley's Believe It or Not!, saying that "If you stumble across something like this, you think 'This can't be!' But it turns out to be true, and that makes it even wilder."

It seems preposterous now, but at the time, people seemed overly concerned about the literal meaning of our lyrics. I know we never discussed it amongst ourselves. Lyrics seemed a necessity, so we had them, but the subject matter was an extension of our interests — not part of a political or aesthetic battle plan. The lyrics were subject to change at whim once the subject had been decided on anyway. Anybody who thinks we overstepped the playground perimeter of lyrical decency (or that the public has any right to demand "social responsibility" from a goddamn punk rock band) is a pure mental dolt, and should step forward and put his tongue up my ass. What we sing about is none of your business anyway.

— Steve Albini

Albini's lyrics drew criticism for apparent racism and homophobia. Racism was a frequent theme in Big Black songs, influenced partly by the sharp racial divisions present in Chicago at the time. The word "darkie" appeared in the first line of the Lungs EP, but Albini defended its use as a comical term, saying "in a way that's a play on the concept of a hateful word. Can a word that's so inherently hilarious be hateful? I don't know." He similarly defended his use of gay jokes and the word "fag": "Given how intermingled the gay and punk subcultures were, it was assumed by anyone involved that open-mindedness, if not free-form experimentation, was the norm. With that assumption under your belt, joke all you like. The word 'fag' isn't just a gay term, it's funny on its own — phonetically — like the words 'hockey puck,' 'mukluks,' 'gefilte fish,' and 'Canada.'" Some critics viewed these defenses as mere justifications for actual deep-seated racism, homophobia, and misogyny on Albini's part, given his level of familiarity with the subject matter, but he insisted that he was not a prejudiced person and was merely satirizing those impulses that rational, civilized persons normally suppress in the course of social interaction: "So once that's given, once you know what you think, there's no reason to be ginger about what you say. A lot of people, they're very careful not to say things that might offend certain people or do anything that might be misinterpreted. But what they don't realize is that the point of all this is to change the way you live your life, not the way you speak."

Albini also emphasized that the songs' lyrics were not the focal point of Big Black, and that the vocals were only there out of necessity: "It seemed like, as instrumental music, it didn't have enough emotional intensity at times, so there would be vocals. But the vocals were not intended to be the center of attention — the interaction within the band and the chaotic nature of the music, that was the important part." However, he did enjoy testing the tolerance of the white liberal hipsters in his audience and provoking reactions out of listeners, stating that one of the band's goals was "to have pointedly offensive records". Terri Sutton of Puncture magazine wrote that the band's stark presentation of evil, deep-seated human impulses bolstered their work against criticism: "The topics are so deliberately loaded that you can't criticize their 'art' without looking like some fucking puritan."

=== Live performances ===
Onstage, Big Black presented an intense spectacle to match their music. Albini would set off a brick of firecrackers onstage before the band played, a tradition he carried on from their earliest performances through their dissolution and revived for their 2006 reunion set, and would count in most songs by yelling "One, two, fuck you!" While playing, the band members would slam their hands against their steel guitar strings so hard that they would draw blood, often needing to put adhesive bandages on their fingers. Albini used a specially-made hip-slung guitar strap worn around his waist like a belt, and would "prowl the stage like a spindly gunslinger", according to Azerrad. Gerard Cosloy recalls that "It looked like someone had plugged Steve into the amp [...] he was pretty scary to watch onstage."

During performances of "Jordan, Minnesota", the band would reach a point where they would prolong a discordant, creepy noise while Albini would perform an intense pantomime as though he were one of the children from the song's lyrics being raped. "It was actually very disturbing to watch", says Durango, "It would really get people unsettled." The band would respond to hecklers with acidic comebacks or deliberately offensive jokes. Describing the intensity of a January 1987 Big Black performance in Forced Exposure, Lydia Lunch remarked that "I was pulverized into near oblivion as wall after wall of frustration, heartache, hatred, death, disease, dis-use, disgust, mistrust, and maelstrom stormed the stage waging war with military precision insistently invading every open orifice with the strength of ten thousand bulls".

== Influence ==
Musically, Big Black's insistent drum machine rhythms, abrasive textures, and obsessively repeated riffs provided a major part of the blueprint for so-called industrial rock. Their bracingly intense music aside, the saving grace of the band's often obnoxious approach was that it was thought-provoking. Big Black set a standard for freedom of expression and forthrightness that has been emulated to varying degrees ever since.

— Michael Azerrad

Through their aggressive guitar playing and use of a drum machine, Big Black's music served as a precursor to industrial rock. Aesthetically, the band's firmly-held ideals, staunch independence, insistence on creative control, and stark lyrical topics had a significant impact on the developing independent rock community. "Big Black was a band that went where few bands dared to go (and where many felt bands shouldn't go)," writes Mark Deming, "and for good or ill their pervasive influence had a seismic impact on indie rock." Albini summed up several of the band's core ideals in his notes to the Pigpile album:

Organizationally, we were committed to a few basic principles: Treat everyone with as much respect as he deserves (and no more), Avoid people who appeal to our vanity or ambition (they always have an angle), Operate as much as possible apart from the "music scene" (which was never our stomping ground), and Take no shit from anyone in the process.

== Members ==
- Steve Albini – vocals, guitar, drum machine programming^{[I]} (1981–1987; died 2024); bass guitar (1981–1982);
- Jeff Pezzati – bass guitar, backing vocals (1983–1984)
- Santiago Durango – guitar, backing vocals (1983–1987)
- Dave Riley – bass guitar, backing vocals (1985–1987; died 2019)

I The band's drum machine is credited as "Roland" on their releases.

== Discography ==
Big Black discography
- Studio albums: 2
- EPs: 4
- Live albums: 2
- Compilation albums: 2
- Singles: 5
- Video albums: 1
- Other appearances: 3

The discography of Big Black consists of two studio albums, two live albums, two compilation albums, four EPs, five singles, and one video album.

=== Studio albums ===
Year	Album details
1986	Atomizer: Released: May 7, 1986; Label: Homestead; Format: LP
1987	Songs About Fucking: Released: September 10, 1987; Label: Touch and Go; Format: LP, CD

=== Live albums ===
Year	Album details
1987	Sound of Impact^{[I]}: Released: 1987; Label: Walls Have Ears; Format: LP
1992	Pigpile: Released: October 5, 1992; Label: Touch and Go; Format: LP, CD

I Sound of Impact is an authorized bootleg released through a subsidiary imprint of Blast First.

=== Compilation albums ===
Year	Album details
1986	The Hammer Party: Released: November 12, 1986; Label: Homestead; Format: LP, CD
1987	The Rich Man's Eight Track Tape: Released: October 12, 1987; Label: Touch and Go; Format: CD

=== Extended plays ===
Year	Release details
1982	Lungs: Released: December 1982; Label: Ruthless; Format: EP
1983	Bulldozer: Released: December 1983; Label: Fever; Format: EP
1985	Racer-X: Released: March 10, 1985; Label: Homestead; Format: EP
1987	Headache: Released: May 22, 1987; Label: Touch and Go; Format: EP

=== Singles ===
Year	Release details
1985	"Rema-Rema"^{[I]}: Released: 1985; Label: Forced Exposure; Format: 7"
1985	"Il Duce": Released: January 26, 1986; Label: Homestead; Format: 7", 12"
1987	"Heartbeat": Released: July 13, 1987; Label: Touch and Go; Format: 7"
1987	"He's a Whore" / "The Model": Released: July 13, 1987; Label: Touch and Go; Format: 7"
1992	"In My House"^{[II]}: Released: October 5, 1992; Label: Touch and Go; Format: 5"

I "Rema-Rema" is a Rema-Rema cover included as a one-sided single with issue No. 9 of Forced Exposure, and limited to 500 copies.

II "In My House" is a Mary Jane Girls cover that was included with copies of the Pigpile video.

=== Video albums ===
Year	Album details
1992	Pigpile: Released: 1992; Label: Touch and Go; Format: VHS

=== Other appearances ===
The following Big Black songs were released on compilation albums. This is not an exhaustive list; songs that were first released on the band's albums, EPs, and singles are not included.

Year	Release details	Track(s)
1984	The Middle of America Compilation: Released: 1984; Label: HID Productions; Format: LP	"Big Payback" (premix); "Hunter's Safety (Tommy Bartlett Dies in Pain)"
1986	God's Favorite Dog: Released: 1986; Label: Touch and Go; Format: LP	"Every Man for Himself"; "Crack Up"
1987	Happiness Is Dry Pants: Released: 1987; Label: Chemical Imbalance; Format: 7"	"Burning Indian Wife"

== See also ==
- You Weren't There: A History of Chicago Punk 1977-1984 (dir. Joe Losurdo and Christina Tillman) (2007) - Documentary
