= Headache (EP) =

1987 EP by Big Black

EP by Big Black
- Released: May 22, 1987
- Genre: Post-hardcore; noise rock
- Length: 11:50
- Label: Touch and Go, Blast First

Big Black chronology
Sound of Impact (1987)	Headache (1987)	The Rich Man's Eight Track Tape (1987)

Professional ratings
Review scores
Source	Rating
AllMusic	3/5 stars
Rolling Stone	3.5/5 stars

Headache is the fourth EP by American post-hardcore band Big Black. The record generated some controversy due to a cover photograph of a shotgun suicide victim whose head was split in half; it only appeared on a very limited edition of the record and was later replaced with a drawing by Savage Pencil. The identity of the dead man in the original album cover remains unknown.

Original pressings bore a sticker reading, "Warning! Not as good as Atomizer, so don't get your hopes up, cheese!" as a frank communication from the members of Big Black to their fans that they did not regard the Headache EP to be as strong as the band's previous release. This also came at a time when major labels were first starting to warn parents that albums contained "explicit lyrics", and while all of Big Black's records contained such lyrics, Headache's sticker was an ironic dig at mainstream music. Copies of the sticker also appeared on the vinyl release of Sonic Youth's Master-Dik EP as an independent music in-joke.

== Track listing ==
All tracks are written by Big Black.

No.	Title	Length
1.	"My Disco"	2:51
2.	"Grinder"	2:26
3.	"Ready Men"	3:50
4.	"Pete, King of All Detectives"	2:43
