= Roland TR-606 =

Drum machine

TR-606
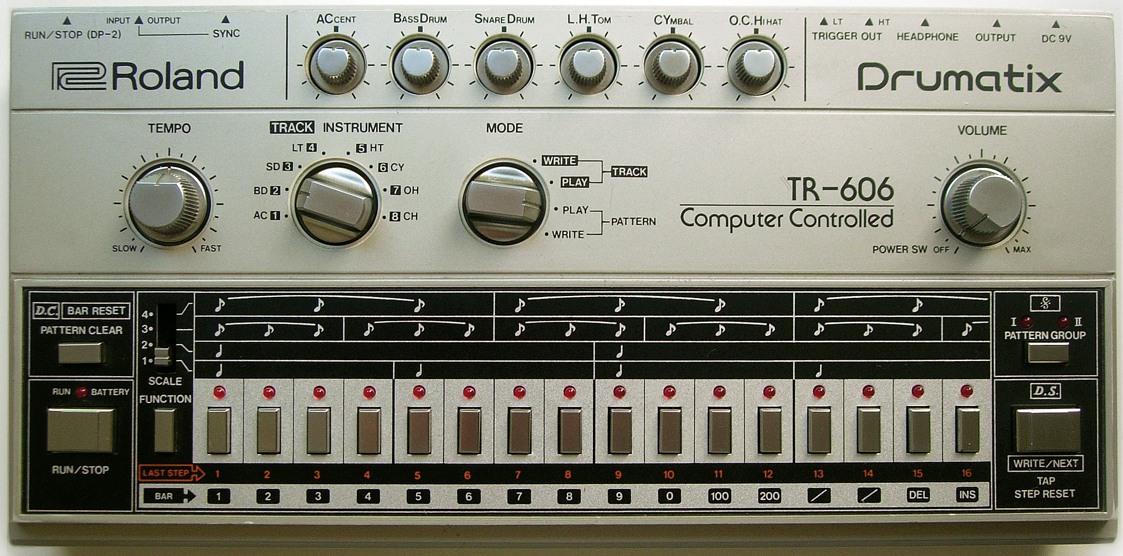
- TR-606 front panel
- Manufacturer: Roland
- Dates: 1981–1984

Technical specifications
- Polyphony: 7
- Timbrality: 7
- Synthesis type: Analog subtractive
- Storage memory: 32 patterns, 8 songs
- Effects: Individual level

Input/output
- Keyboard: 16 pattern keys
- External control: DIN sync in/out

The Roland TR-606 Drumatix is a drum machine built by Roland Corporation from 1981 to 1984.

== Sounds ==
It uses analog synthesis rather than samples to produce sound. It imitates acoustic percussion: the bass drum, snare, toms, cymbal and hi-hat (open and closed). The sounds cannot be edited. MusicRadar wrote that "the snare snaps and cracks, the kick offers a satisfying thud, and the metallic hats sizzle".

== Sequencer ==
Rhythms can be programmed using the sequencer, which includes controls for accents. The sequencer can hold 32 patterns in memory, and patterns can be sequenced to create songs. The TR-606 was designed to be used with the Roland TB-303 bass synthesizer, and can be synchronized using DIN sync.

== Users ==
The TR-606 was used by artists including the Sisters of Mercy, Orchestral Manoeuvres in the Dark, Skinny Puppy, Big Black, Autechre, Aphex Twin, Luke Vibert, Massive Attack, and Nine Inch Nails. It is used frequently in IDM. The electronic musician Kid606 took his stage name from the TR-606.
