= Santiago Durango =

Colombian-American punk-rock guitarist

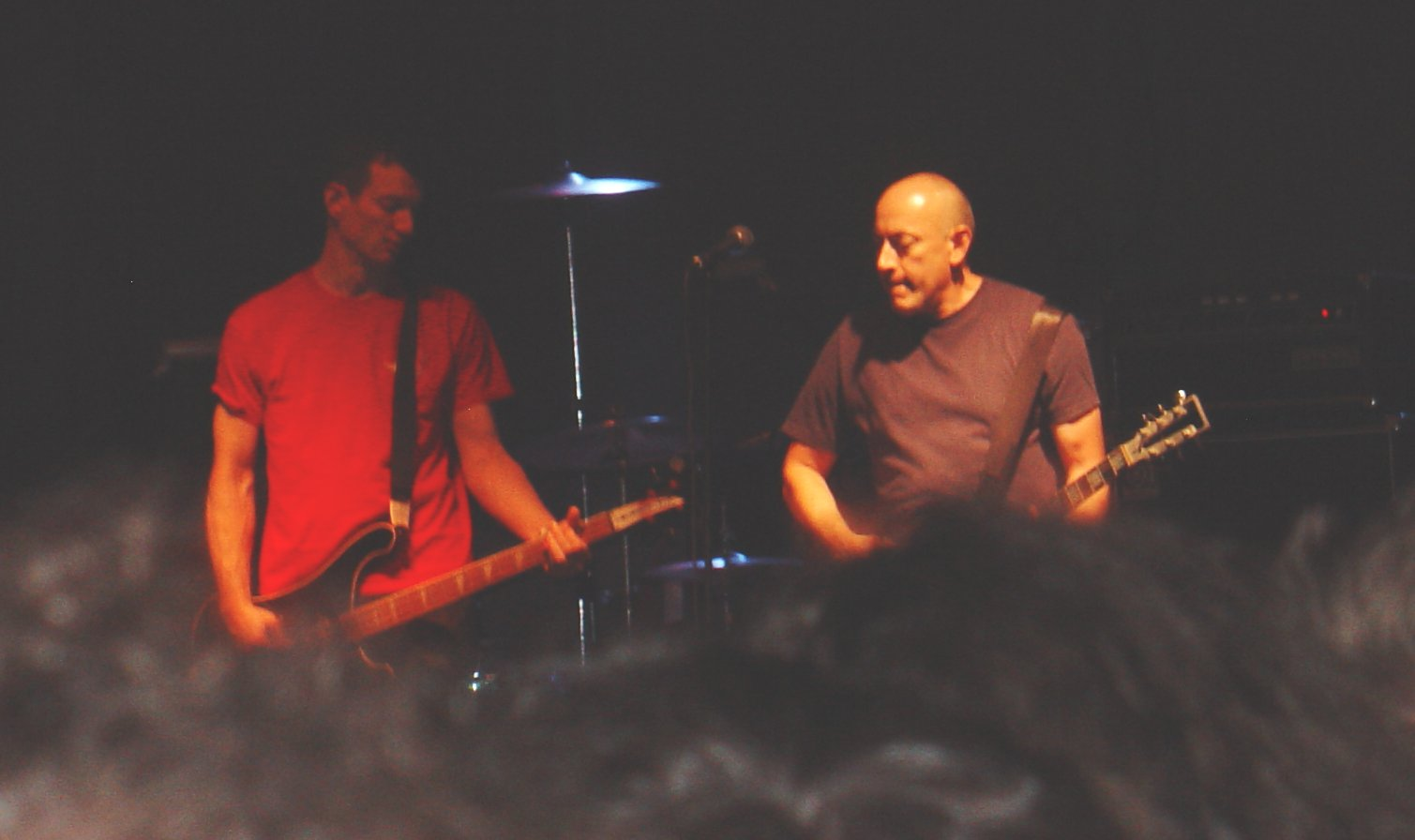
- Jeff Pezzati (left) and Santiago Durango (right) during the 2006 Big Black Reunion

Background information
- Born: Santiago Alonso Durango; 1957 (age 68–69); Colombia
- Origin: Ottawa, Illinois
- Genres: Punk rock; post-hardcore; noise-rock
- Occupations: Lawyer; musician
- Years active: 1981–2000; 2006
- Label: Touch and Go
- Formerly of: Big Black; Naked Raygun; Arsenal
- Education: University of Illinois Chicago

Santiago Alonso Durango (born 1957) is a Colombian–American attorney and retired musician. He is best known for his work with the 1980s punk rock groups Naked Raygun and Big Black.

== Life and career ==
Durango is the son of a Colombian doctor. His family moved to Chicago, Illinois in the US when he was ten years old.

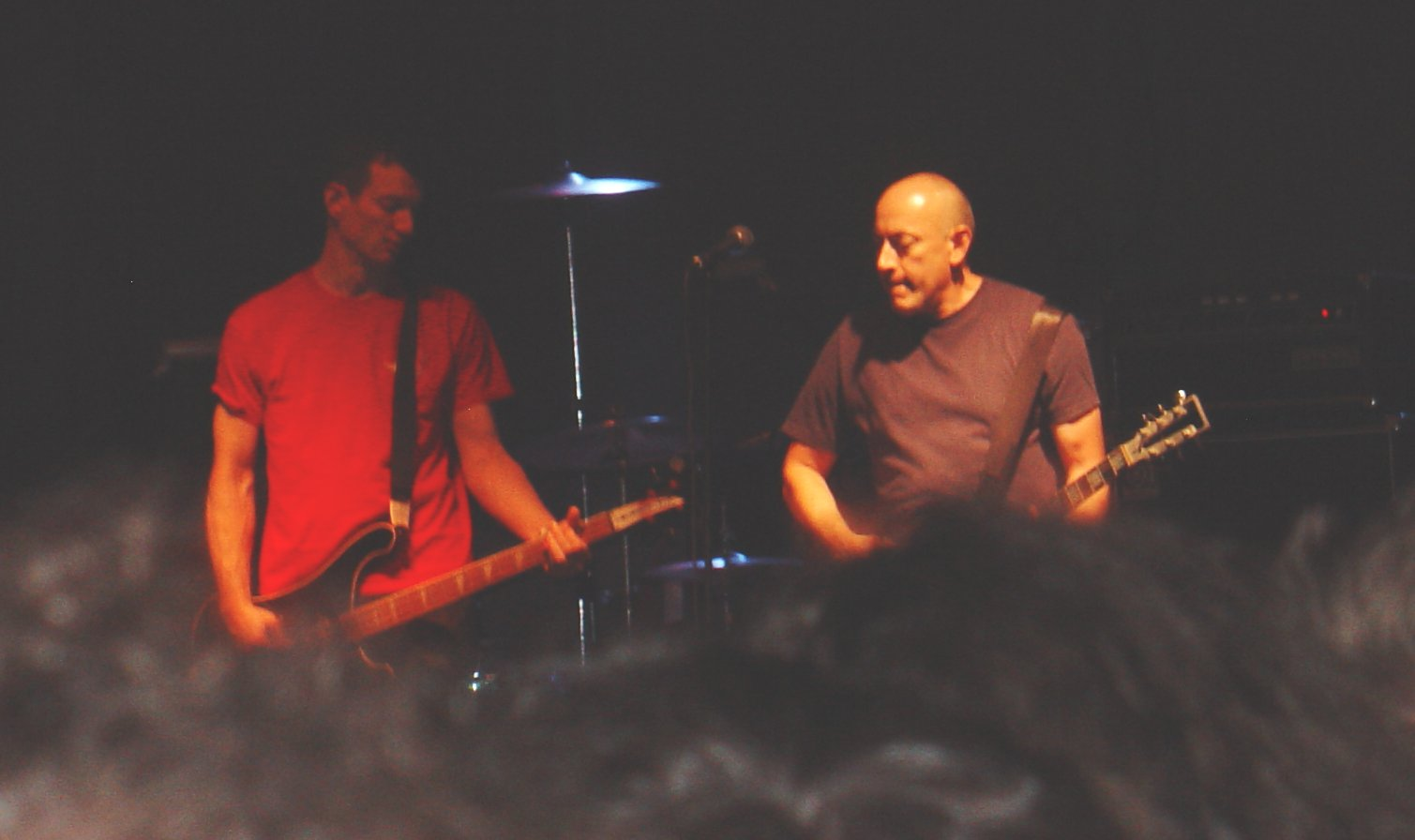
Jeff Pezzati and Santiago Durango (2006)

A graduate of the University of Illinois Chicago, Durango was an original member of Naked Raygun, one of Chicago's first punk rock bands. Naked Raygun fan Steve Albini was forming a band called Big Black and asked both Durango and Raygun lead singer Jeff Pezzati to join. Durango remained a member until the group broke up in 1987. Critic Mark Deming of AllMusic describes Santiago and Albini as a good pairing musically; "his muscular guitar sound was the ideal match of Albini's jagged, metallic tone."

After Big Black ended, Durango attended law school. During that time he formed a new band called Arsenal with bassist Malachi Ritscher. Together they released the Manipulator EP on Touch and Go Records in 1988. In 1990, Durango teamed up with Pierre Kezdy of Naked Raygun on bass to record and release a second Arsenal EP entitled Factory Smog Is a Sign of Progress.

After law school, in his first case he helped recover Cynthia Plastercaster's bronze casts of the genitalia of various rock and roll artists, including that of Jimi Hendrix. He handled some litigation for Chicago's Touch and Go Records. As of 2003, Durango was an appellate defender based in Ottawa, Illinois.

In 2006, Durango participated in a brief Big Black reunion to celebrate the 25th anniversary of Touch and Go Records.
