= List of post-punk bands =

The following is a list of post-punk bands. Post-punk is a musical movement that began at the end of the 1970s, following on the heels of the initial punk rock movement. The essential period that is most commonly cited as post-punk falls between 1978 and 1984.

Contents
0–9 · A · B · C · D · E · F · G · H · I · J · K · L · M · N · O · P · R · S · T · U · V · W · X · Y · Z

== 0–9 ==
- 23 Skidoo

== A ==
- Adam and the Ants
- The Alarm
- Algiers
- ...And the Native Hipsters
- The Art Attacks
- Artery
- Associates
- Au Pairs
- Aztec Camera

== B ==
- The B-52's
- The Batfish Boys
- Basht.
- Bauhaus
- Bhopal Stiffs
- Big Black
- The Birthday Party
- Black Midi
- The Blackouts
- Blam Blam Blam
- Blue Orchids
- Blyth Power
- The Bolshoi
- Bush Tetras

== C ==
- Cabaret Voltaire
- Capital Inicial
- Cardiacs
- Cattle
- A Certain Ratio
- The Chameleons
- James Chance and the Contortions
- The Chills
- Circus Mort
- The Clash
- The Clean
- Clock DVA
- Cocteau Twins
- The Comsat Angels
- Crisis
- The Cult
- Cumgirl8
- The Cure

== D ==
- DA!
- Dalek I Love You
- Damien Done
- Dead Can Dance
- Dead Tooth
- The Deep Freeze Mice
- The Del-Byzanteens
- Delta 5
- Depeche Mode
- Desperate Bicycles
- Deutsch Amerikanische Freundschaft (D.A.F.)
- Devo
- Dinosaur Jr.
- Do-Re-Mi
- The Dream Syndicate
- Dry Cleaning
- The Durutti Column

== E ==
- Echo & the Bunnymen
- ESG
- Essential Logic
- Eurogliders
- The Ex
- Eyeless in Gaza

== F ==
- Factrix
- Faith No More
- The Fall
- Family Fodder
- The Feelies
- Felt
- The Fire Engines
- Flipper
- The Flying Lizards
- Fontaines D.C.
- For Against
- Fra Lippo Lippi (early work)
- Paula Frazer
- Frightwig

== G ==
- Gang of Four
- Gene Loves Jezebel
- Gilla Band
- Girls at Our Best!
- Glaxo Babies
- Green River
- The Gun Club

== H ==
- Half Man Half Biscuit
- Happy Mondays
- Heaven 17
- High Vis
- The Higsons
- The Human League
- Hüsker Dü

== I ==
- Idles
- I'm So Hollow
- In Camera
- Irk

== J ==
- The Jam
- Japan
- The Jesus Lizard
- The Jesus and Mary Chain
- Josef K
- Joy Division

== K ==
- Killing Joke
- Kino

== L ==
- Laughing Clowns
- LiLiPUT
- The Lords of the New Church
- Love and Rockets
- Lowlife
- Ludus

== M ==
- Magazine
- Maximum Joy
- Meat Puppets
- The Mekons
- Melvins
- The Membranes
- The Method Actors
- Midnight Oil (early work)
- Minimal Compact
- Minny Pops
- Mission of Burma
- Mo-dettes
- Models
- Modern English
- Modern Eon
- Molchat Doma
- The Monochrome Set
- Motorama

== N ==
- Naked Raygun
- The Names
- New Model Army
- New Order
- Nick Cave and the Bad Seeds
- The Nightingales
- Nina Hagen

== O ==
- The Opposition
- Orange Juice
- Orchestral Manoeuvres in the Dark

== P ==
- Palais Schaumburg
- Palm Ghosts
- The Passage
- The Passions
- Pel Mel
- Pere Ubu
- Phantom Tollbooth
- Pigbag
- Pink Military
- The Pogues
- The Police
- The Pop Group
- Priests
- Primitive Calculators
- The Proclaimers
- The Psychedelic Furs
- Public Image Ltd
- Pylon

== R ==
- The Raincoats
- Rank and File
- Retsepti
- Red Lorry Yellow Lorry
- Rema-Rema
- R.E.M.
- The Residents
- Rip Rig + Panic
- Romeo Void

== S ==
- Sad Lovers & Giants
- Savage Republic
- SadSvit
- The Scientists
- Scratch Acid
- Scritti Politti
- Section 25
- Sex Gang Children
- Sielun Veljet
- Simple Minds
- Siouxsie and the Banshees
- The Sisters of Mercy
- Skeletal Family
- The Sleepers
- The Slits
- The Smiths
- The Soft Boys
- The Sound
- Southern Death Cult
- Squeeze
- Street Eaters
- Subway Sect
- Sukatani
- Sunnyboys
- Swell Maps

== T ==
- Talking Heads
- The Teardrop Explodes
- Television
- Television Personalities
- The The
- Theatre of Hate
- This Heat
- Thompson Twins (early work)
- The Three Johns
- Throbbing Gristle
- Tin Huey
- Tones on Tail
- Transvision Vamp
- Tuxedomoon

== U ==
- U2
- UK Decay
- Ultravox

== V ==
- The Veils
- Viagra Boys
- Violent Femmes
- Voigt/465
- Volcano Suns

== W ==
- The Wake
- Wall of Voodoo
- The Wedding Present
- Whirlywirld
- Wire

== X ==
- Xero
- XTC

== Y ==
- Yard Act
- Young Marble Giants

== Z ==
- Zounds

== See also ==
- List of gothic rock artists
- List of new wave artists
- List of punk rock bands, 0–K
- List of punk rock bands, L–Z
- List of post-hardcore bands
