= WZRD (FM) =

Radio station at Northeastern Illinois University

- Chicago, Illinois; United States
- Broadcast area: Chicago area
- Frequency: 88.3 MHz
- Branding: The Wizard

Programming
- Format: Freeform
- Affiliations: Pacifica Radio Network

Ownership
- Owner: Northeastern Illinois University

History
- First air date: 1974
- Call sign meaning: "Wizard"

Technical information
- Licensing authority: FCC
- Facility ID: 49444
- Class: A
- ERP: 100 watts
- HAAT: 22 meters (72 ft)
- Transmitter coordinates: 41°58′56.1″N 87°43′7.2″W

Links
- Public license information: Public file; LMS
- Webcast: Listen live
- Website: www.wzrdchicago.org

WZRD (88.3 MHz) is the student-run FM radio station at Northeastern Illinois University, Chicago, Illinois, US, founded in 1974. The station serves the Chicago area. The station is licensed by the FCC to Northeastern Illinois University. WZRD broadcasts on a freeform radio format and is a Pacifica Radio affiliate.

== Live performances ==
WZRD has hosted live in-studio performances over the years and many artists that played and continue to play in-studio during WZRD's "Thursday Night Live" program—a long running weekly live performance show featuring local, national, and international acts.

== Importance in the Chicago Punk scene (1980s) ==
WZRD was a hotbed for local and touring punk, hardcore, and post-punk groups in the 1980s. Steve Bjorklund, an early figure in Chicago's punk scene writes in the liner notes of The Effigies album "Remains Nonviewable":

It was the early spring of 1980, and the occasion was a free show by a shitty band called A Minimal Graphic in the auditorium at Northeastern Illinois University on the northwest side. Northeastern Illinois University was significant because it housed the only radio station in Chicago that wasn't afraid to play punk rock.

Prominent figure in Chicago music, Steve Albini, states in Naked Raygun's Basement Screams reissue's liner notes that "Sunday Morning Nightmare" on WZRD was the "one radio program" for Chicago punk in the early 1980s. WZRD's role in the Chicago Punk scene was discussed in You Weren't There, a 2007 film that documents the Chicago Punk scene from 1977 through 1984.

== 2012 temporary closure ==
On June 29, 2012, Northeastern Illinois University temporarily closed down operations of WZRD due to issues of mismanagement. For instance, WZRD's broadcast license had expired, resulting in NEIU itself paying a $7,000 fine for failure to apply for renewal and for operating while no longer having a broadcast license, and having to ask for special temporary authority from the FCC to keep the station on the air. Northeastern Illinois University Director of Student Leadership Development declared that the future of the radio club—and possibly the re-purposing of the radio station—would be decided following a search for a different programming format. In the meantime, WZRD would continue broadcasting using a "skeleton team", under the strict control of the university. The on-air programming was mostly provided by an automated DJ system.

On Tuesday, November 13, 2012, NEIU's newspaper the Independent headline story was "WZRD 88.3 Back in Business." Based on what the administration handed down to the collective, it did not reflect the Exiler's intentions. "The Participants will be expected to abide by standards of conduct compatible with Northeastern Illinois University standards...Wizard will be overseen by the Office of Student Leadership" and furthermore it said that although the students would retain their autonomy "the organization's bylaws, constitution, and powers of the program manager require revision and the addition of a 'statement of civility and decorum on how the actions of Djs will be treated'"

== See also ==
- Campus radio
- List of college radio stations in the United States
