= You Weren't There =

Documentary film on Chicago punk music

You Weren't There: A History of Chicago Punk, 1977–1984 is a 2007 documentary film about punk subculture in Chicago from 1977 through 1984. The film was written and directed by Joe Losurdo and Christina Tillman, and profiles the punk bars and local bands that gave rise to the city's punk rock scene in the late 1970s and early 1980s. Losurdo was the one-time bass player for the Chicago-based 1980s hardcore band, Life Sentence, although his group is not profiled in the movie. Reviewer Max Goldberg of the San Francisco Bay Guardian called the film "a thrillingly exhaustive survey of early Chicago punk."

You Weren't There was released on DVD in 2009. A limited edition white vinyl LP of the soundtrack was also issued and came packaged with copies of the DVD. The film was released on Vimeo in 2014.

== Bands profiled in the film ==
- Articles Of Faith
- Big Black
- DA!
- The Effigies
- End Result
- Mentally Ill
- Naked Raygun
- Negative Element
- Rights of the Accused
- Savage Beliefs
- Silver Abuse
- Strike Under
- Subverts
- Tutu And The Pirates
- Verböten
- The Way-Outs

== People interviewed in the film ==
- Terry Fox (Mgr. O'Banion's, Mgr. Tut's, Owner Exit, Clox)
- Ken Ellis (La Mere Vipere, O'Banion's, Rainbow Club)
- John Kezdy (The Effigies)
- Vic Bondi (Articles Of Faith)
- Steve Bjorklund (Strike Under)
- Chris Bjorklund (Strike Under)
- Jeff Pezzati (Naked Raygun)
- Santiago Durango (Silver Abuse, Naked Raygun, Big Black)
- Steve Albini (Big Black)
- John Haggerty (Naked Raygun)
- Mike O'Connell (Rights Of The Accused)
- Anthony Illarde (Rights Of The Accused)
- Jay Yuenger (Rights Of The Accused)
- Dave Springer (Tutu and the Pirates)
- Pierre Kezdy (Strike Under, Trial By Fire, Naked Raygun)
- Earl Letiecq (The Effigies)
- Barry Stepe (Negative Element)
- Chopper Stepe (Negative Element)
- Steve Stepe (Rights Of The Accused)
- Dem Hopkins (owner of the Oz bar)
- Eric Nihilist (local promoter)
- Rodney Anderson (Seismic Waves, Fast & Loud Radio)
- Timothy Powell (sound engineer)
- Terry Nelson (DJ for WZRD Chicago)
- Bill Meehan (Silver Abuse, The Way-Outs)
- Camilo Gonzalez (Silver Abuse, The Way-Outs, Naked Raygun)
- Steve Smith (End Result)
- Lorna Donley (DA!)
- Brian Gay (Savage Beliefs)
- Special Ed (Mentally Ill)
- Sado Marquis (Mentally Ill)
- Brian Green (Subverts)
- Steve Ross (Subverts)
- Jason Narducy (Verboten)

== Soundtrack ==
- Tutu & The Pirates - "Wham Bam Son Of Sam"
- Mentally Ill - "Gacy's Place"
- Buzzards - Who Are The Boys?
- The Way-Outs - "Surf Combat"
- Painterband - "Reactor"
- Strike Under - "Elephant's Graveyard"
- DA! - "Dark Rooms"
- Subverts - "Eyesore"
- Toothpaste - "Spy Guy"
- End Result - "They Love War"
- Naked Raygun - "Tojo (demo)"
- Trial By Fire - "Rocks Of Sweden"
- Articles Of Faith - "I Got Mine"
- Negative Element - "Anti-Pac-Man"
- Verboten - "Slump Shot"
- Rights Of The Accused - "Fuckup"
- Savage Beliefs - "Big Big Sky"
- Nadsat Rebel - "Bounty"
- Seismic Waves - "Lypsynch To The Go-Gos"
