= Pierre Kezdy =

American bass player (1962–2020)

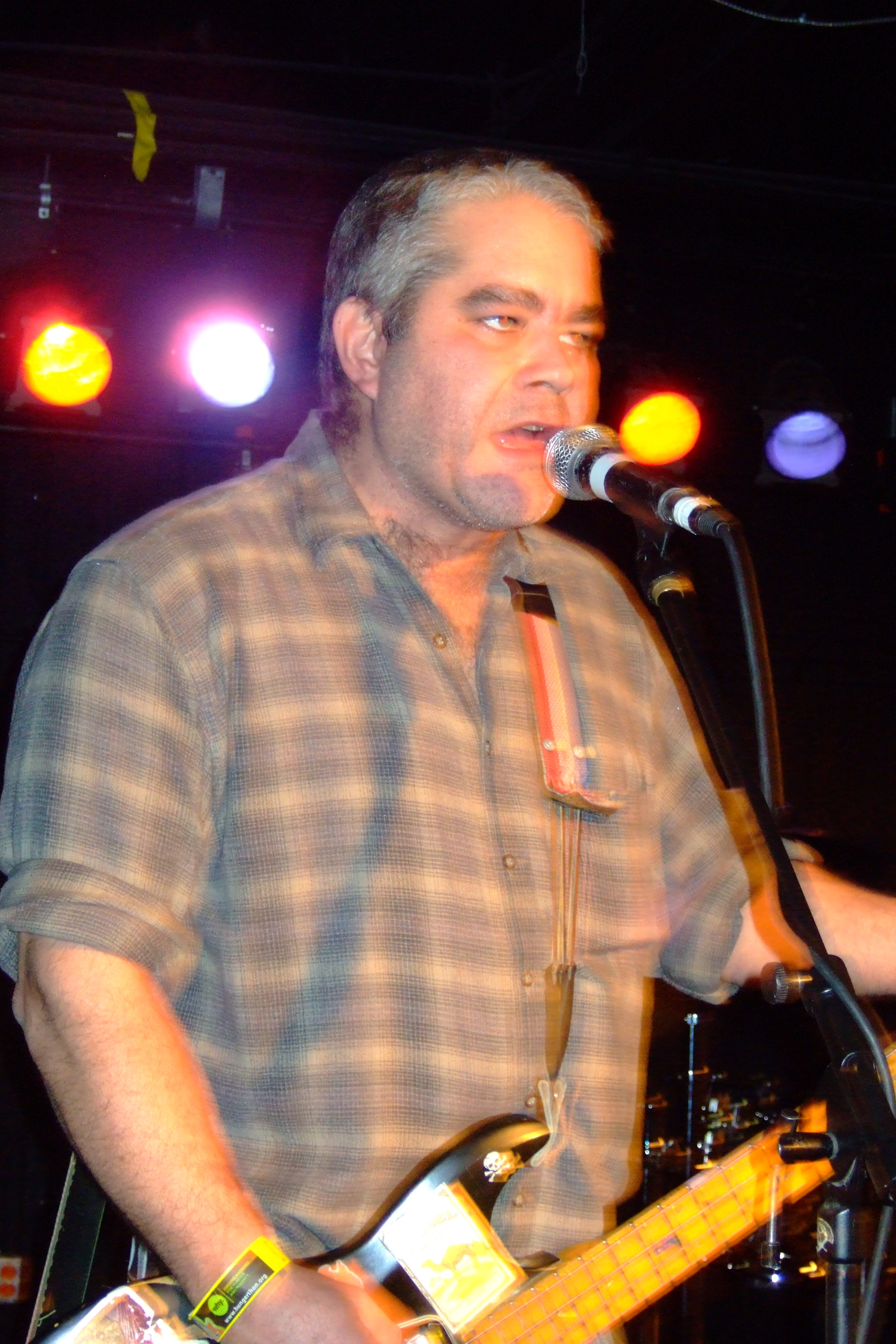
- Kezdy performing in 2007

Background information
- Born: January 4, 1962
- Origin: Chicago, Illinois, U.S.
- Died: October 9, 2020 (aged 58) Glenview, Illinois, U.S.
- Genres: Punk rock
- Occupation: Musician
- Instrument: Bass
- Years active: 1980–2020
- Labels: Caroline, Quarterstick, Wax Trax!, Riot Fest
- Formerly of: Naked Raygun, Pegboy, Strike Under, Arsenal, Trial By Fire

Pierre Kezdy (January 4, 1962 – October 9, 2020) was an American bassist and songwriter, known for playing with various Chicago punk bands, including Naked Raygun, Pegboy, Strike Under, Arsenal, and Trial By Fire. He was also the younger brother of Effigies frontman John Kezdy.

== Biography ==
Kezdy started with the band Strike Under in either 1979 or 1980. When Steve Bjorklund, the band's lead singer, left the band in 1981, the remaining members, including Kezdy, formed a new band called Trial By Fire. When that band folded in 1982, Kezdy went on to replace Camilo Gonzalez in Naked Raygun, joining them in time for their second album All Rise. Naked Raygun ceased performing in 1992. In 1994 Kezdy replaced Steve Saylors in Pegboy, the band started by former Naked Raygun bandmate John Haggerty. When Naked Raygun started playing again in 2007, Kezdy was replaced in Pegboy by Mike Thompson. Kezdy suffered a stroke in 2010 and was unable to perform live with Naked Raygun, so Sensitive Pete, who was already part of Jeff Pezzati's band, the Bomb, played bass for their live shows. Kezdy did re-join Naked Raygun for live shows in 2013, playing baritone guitar with Fritz Doreza playing bass.

Other bands that Kezdy has played with include the Rainbow Girls (with his brother John Kezdy, of the Effigies), the Interceptors and Arsenal (both with Santiago Durango). Kezdy played a Gibson G3 bass guitar.

Kezdy was interviewed for the film You Weren't There and two of his bands (Naked Raygun and Strike Under) were profiled.

== Death ==
Kezdy died of cancer on October 9, 2020.

== Partial discography ==
=== Strike Under ===
- Immediate Action 12" EP (1981)

=== Naked Raygun ===
- All Rise (1986)
- Jettison (1988)
- Understand? (1989)
- Raygun...Naked Raygun (1990)
- Last of the Demo Hicans (1997)
- Free Shit (2001)
- What Poor Gods We Do Make DVD (2007)

=== Pegboy ===
- Earwig (1994)
- Cha Cha Damore (1997)

== Reception ==
- "Ex-Raygun bassist Pierre Kezdy's steely edge is further ferocious: even his old favorite J.J. Burnel of the Stranglers would karate-kick for such a ripping, trebly sharpness." (Jack Rabid, Allmusic)
- "Pierre Kezdy's bass gurgles blood on one track, and is swampy on the next." (Bob Gendron, Allmusic)
- "Pierre Kezdy's bass sounds like a power tool" (Greg Kot, Chicago Tribune)
