= All Rise (Naked Raygun album) =

Studio album by Naked Raygun
- Released: 1986
- Recorded: 1985 at the Chicago Recording Company, Chicago
- Genre: Punk rock
- Length: 30:24
- Label: Homestead
- Producer: Iain Burgess, Naked Raygun

Naked Raygun chronology
Throb Throb (1985)	All Rise (1986)	Jettison (1988)

Professional ratings
Review scores
Source	Rating
AllMusic	3/5 stars
Robert Christgau	B

All Rise is the second studio album recorded by Chicago punk rock band Naked Raygun in 1985 and released on LP by Homestead Records in 1986. All Rise is the first Naked Raygun album to feature Pierre Kezdy on bass and Eric Spicer on drums, though all of the album's songs had been written by vocalist Jeff Pezzati and guitarist John Haggerty before Kezdy and Spicer joined the band. At least one song, "New Dreams", was written during earlier incarnations of the band and a live version appears as a bonus track to the band's Basement Screams EP from 1983.

When Quarterstick Records re-released all of Naked Raygun's early albums in the late 90s, two bonus tracks were added to the CD album and appear on subsequent digital releases.

== Track listing ==
All tracks are written by Jeff Pezzati, except where noted.

No.	Title	Writer(s)	Length
1.	"Home of the Brave"		2:04
2.	"Dog at Large"		2:16
3.	"Knock Me Down"		2:17
4.	"Mr. Gridlock"		3:08
5.	"The Strip"		1:46
6.	"I Remember"	John Haggerty	2:20
7.	"Those Who Move"		2:25
8.	"The Envelope"		2:25
9.	"Backlash Jack"	John Haggerty, Pierre Kezdy, Eric Spicer	2:41
10.	"Peacemaker"		3:13
11.	"New Dreams"	Santiago Durango	1:23

1999 CD re-issue bonus tracks
No.	Title	Writer(s)	Length
12.	"Slim" (Originally appeared as the B-side of the band's single "Vanilla Blue")	Naked Raygun	3:00
13.	"Rocks of Sweden" (Originally appeared on the compilation LP Rat Music for Rat People Vol. III)	Pierre Kezdy	1:26

== Personnel ==
Naked Raygun

- Jeff Pezzati – vocals
- John Haggerty – guitar
- Pierre Kezdy – bass guitar
- Eric Spicer – drums

Production and additional personnel

- Steve Albini – design
- Iain Burgess – production
- Rick A. Cosaro – photography, design
- Naked Raygun – production
