= Three-Chord Monte =

EP by Pegboy
- Released: 1990
- Recorded: June 1990 at Bombadier Beetle Studios
- Genre: Punk rock
- Length: 14:07
- Label: Quarterstick
- Producer: Iain Burgess

Pegboy chronology
Three-Chord Monte (1990)	Strong Reaction (1991)

Professional ratings
Review scores
Source	Rating
Allmusic	4.5/5 stars

Three-Chord Monte is an EP by Pegboy, released in 1990 through Quarterstick Records.

== Track listing ==
All tracks are written by Pegboy.

Side one
No.	Title	Length
1.	"Through My Fingers"	4:03
2.	"My Youth"	2:43

Side two
No.	Title	Length
1.	"Fade Away"	3:34
2.	"Method"	3:45

== Personnel ==
Pegboy

- Larry Damore – vocals
- Joe Haggerty – drums
- John Haggerty – guitar
- Steve Saylors – bass guitar, backing vocals

Production and additional personnel

- Iain Burgess – production, engineering
