= Jettison =

Jettison may refer to:

- Jettison (shipping), cargo discarded from a ship or wreckage
- Jettison (aviation), an aviation term to discard fuel or weapons in flight by use of a mechanism, switch or handle
  - Fuel jettison, a procedure used by aircraft in certain emergency situations

== Entertainment ==
- Jettison (album), an album by Chicago punk rock band Naked Raygun, released in 1988
- Jettison, a play by actor Brendan Bradley
- "Jettison", a song from the album The Virginian by Neko Case
- Jettison (record label), a Chicago-based indie record label owned by Jeff Pezzati of Naked Raygun
- Jettison (Steady Ground album), an album by Alternative Rock band Steady Ground, released in 2007
- Jettison (band), a punk band from the 1980s
- Jettison (book), a book written by D.E. White

== See also ==
- The Jetsons
