= Rat Patrol (disambiguation) =

Rat Patrol may refer to:

- The Rat Patrol, a television show
- "Rat Patrol", a song by Naked Raygun on Throb Throb
- "Rat Patrol", a song by They Might Be Giants on Long Tall Weekend
- "Rat Patrol", a song by the Untouchables on Flex Your Head

== See also ==
- Combat Rock, an album with the working title Rat Patrol from Fort Bragg
