= Strong Reaction =

Studio album by Pegboy
- Released: September 15, 1991
- Recorded: June 1991
- Studio: CRC (Chicago)
- Genre: Punk rock
- Length: 27:13
- Label: Quarterstick
- Producer: Iain Burgess

Pegboy chronology
Three-Chord Monte (1990)	Strong Reaction (1991)	Fore (1993)

Professional ratings
Review scores
Source	Rating
AllMusic	3/5 stars

Strong Reaction is the debut album of Pegboy. It was released in 1991 through Quarterstick Records.

== Critical reception ==
Trouser Press wrote that "quibbles about the occasionally melodramatic lyrics, in which the passage into adulthood dissolves into tragedy, are obliterated by the ferocious attack."

In a retrospective review, The A.V. Club wrote: "Skirting grunge, pop-punk, post-hardcore, and emo—all of which were erupting at the time—Strong Reaction has aged with a rugged grace that puts most of its contemporaries to shame."

== Track listing ==
All tracks are written by Pegboy.

No.	Title	Length
1.	"Strong Reaction"	3:57
2.	"Still Uneasy"	2:41
3.	"Not What I Want"	2:31
4.	"What to Do"	2:50
5.	"Locomotivelung"	2:41
6.	"Superstar"	2:24
7.	"Field of Darkness"	2:58
8.	"Time Again"	3:01
9.	"Believe"	2:45
10.	"Hardlight"	1:25
11.	"[untitled]"	0:34

CD bonus tracks
No.	Title	Length
12.	"Through My Fingers"	4:03
13.	"My Youth"	2:43
14.	"Fade Away"	3:34
15.	"Method"	3:45

== Personnel ==
Pegboy

- Larry Damore – lead vocals, guitar
- Joe Haggerty – drums
- John Haggerty – guitar
- Steve Saylors – bass guitar, backing vocals

Production and additional personnel

- Iain Burgess – production, engineering
- Michael Roberts – photography
- Chuck Uchida – engineering
