= Earwig (Pegboy album) =

Studio album by Pegboy
- Released: October 24, 1994
- Recorded: April 1994 at Blackbox Studios, Noyant-la-Gravoyère, France
- Genre: Punk rock
- Length: 31:07
- Label: Quarterstick
- Producer: Iain Burgess

Pegboy chronology
Fore (1993)	Earwig (1994)	Cha Cha Damore (1997)

Professional ratings
Review scores
Source	Rating
AllMusic	3/5 stars

Earwig is the second studio album by the punk rock band Pegboy. It was released in 1994 through Quarterstick Records.

== Critical reception ==
The Daily Times wrote that "Pegboy's combination of classic punk structure with John Haggerty's furious guitar work makes it a band to be reckoned with and marks Earwig as one of the fall's best releases." The Chicago Tribune wrote that the band "pours in some of the feel of Seam in lead singer Larry Damore's wistful lyrics, hardened behind a big three-chord grind from ex-Naked Raygun guitarist John Haggerty." Trouser Press called the album "respectable if hardly revelatory," writing that "the pleasure comes in hearing the Haggerty brothers interact; John sounds like he’s trying to drill holes in the wall of the percussion Joe throws up on 'Gordo.'" The Washington Post wrote that "some of the tracks tend to blur, but ones like 'You' and 'Blister' achieve a potent merger of pop and wallop."

== Track listing ==
All tracks are written by Pegboy, except "Revolver" by Clint Conley.

No.	Title	Length
1.	"Line Up"	2:34
2.	"Sinner Inside"	2:26
3.	"Gordo"	2:50
4.	"Side Show"	3:13
5.	"Spaghetti Western"	2:34
6.	"Revolver"	4:09
7.	"You"	2:56
8.	"Blister"	2:30
9.	"Wages of Sin"	2:48
10.	"Mr. Pink"	2:05
11.	"Over the Hills"	2:43
12.	"Louisiana"	3:17

== Personnel ==
Pegboy

- Larry Damore – vocals
- Joe Haggerty – drums
- John Haggerty – guitar
- Pierre Kezdy – bass guitar

Production and additional personnel

- Iain Burgess – production, engineering
- Peter Deimel – engineering
- Frank Marte – art directions, design
