= Fizzjob =

Studio album by Didjits
- Released: 1986
- Recorded: September 1, 1986
- Studio: Chicago Recording Company
- Genre: Hardcore punk
- Length: 19:43
- Label: Bam Bam (original release); Touch & Go (reissue)
- Producer: Iain Burgess, Didjits

Didjits chronology
Fizzjob (1986)	Hey Judester (1988)

Professional ratings
Review scores
Source	Rating
Allmusic	2/5 stars

Fizzjob is the debut album of Didjits, released in 1986 through Bam Bam Records.

== Track listing ==
All tracks are written by Didjits.

Side one
No.	Title	Length
1.	"Jerry Lee"	2:35
2.	"Hafta Be Cool to Rule/Wingtips"	2:28
3.	"California Surf Queen"	2:28
4.	"Pet Funeral"	2:24
5.	"C'Mon Baby"	2:47

Side two
No.	Title	Length
1.	"Fix Some Food Bitch"	2:21
2.	"Reflective Brain"	1:38
3.	"Beast le Brutale"	1:58
4.	"Mexican Death Horse"	1:56
5.	"Elvis' Corvette"	1:36

== Personnel ==
Didjits

- Doug Evans – bass guitar
- Brad Sims – drums
- Rick Sims – vocals, guitar

Production and additional personnel

- Iain Burgess – production
- Didjits – production
- David Landis – illustrations
