= Hornet Piñata =

Studio album by Didjits
- Released: July 22, 1990
- Genre: Punk rock
- Length: 28:09
- Label: Touch and Go
- Producer: Iain Burgess, Didjits

Didjits chronology
Hey Judester (1988)	Hornet Piñata (1990)	Full Nelson Reilly (1991)

Professional ratings
Review scores
Source	Rating
Allmusic	4.5/5 stars

Hornet Piñata is the third album by American punk rock band The Didjits, released on July 22, 1990, through Touch and Go Records. There were two music videos produced: Captain Ahab and Sweet Sweet Satan.

== Track listing ==
All tracks are written by Didjits, except "Call Me Animal" by the MC5 and "Foxey Lady" by Jimi Hendrix.

No.	Title	Length
1.	"Killboy Powerhead"	2:00
2.	"Captain Ahab"	2:15
3.	"Long Lone Ranger"	2:18
4.	"Gold Eldorado"	1:57
5.	"Evel Knievel"	2:16
6.	"Cutting Carol"	1:45
7.	"Goodbye Mr. Policeman"	1:30
8.	"Sweet Sweet Satan"	2:46
9.	"Baby Ür a Dräg"	2:20
10.	"Call Me Animal"	1:49
11.	"Joker Express"	2:27
12.	"Hooly Ghouly"	1:27
13.	"Foxey Lady"	3:19

== Accolades ==
Year	Publication	Country	Accolade	Rank
1995	Alternative Press	United States	"Top 99 of '85 to '95"	77
"*" denotes an unordered list.

== Personnel ==
Didjits

- Doug Evans – bass guitar, vocals (Foxey Lady only)
- Brad Sims – drums
- Rick Sims – vocals, guitar

Production and additional personnel

- Iain Burgess – production
- Didjits – production
- David Landis – cover art
