= Pegboy =

American punk rock band

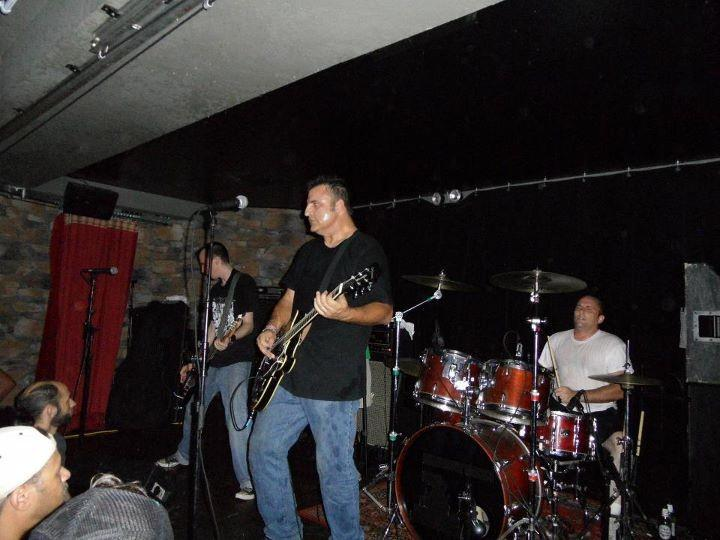
- Live in 2011

Background information
- Origin: Chicago, Illinois
- Genres: Punk rock
- Years active: 1990-present
- Label: Quarterstick
- Spinoff of: Naked Raygun, Bhopal Stiffs
- Members: John Haggerty; Joe Haggerty; Larry Damore; Herb Rosen
- Past members: Steve Saylors; Steve Albini; Pierre Kezdy
- Website: Myspace

Pegboy is an American punk band from Chicago, Illinois with a relatively large cult following. They were founded in 1990 by John Haggerty (ex-guitarist for Naked Raygun), along with his brother Joe Haggerty (drums, formerly of The Effigies), Larry Damore (vocals/guitar), and Steve Saylors (bass). Both Damore and Saylors had been members of the Chicago-based hardcore band Bhopal Stiffs, whose 1987 demo had been produced by John Haggerty. Pegboy's 1990 debut EP, "Three-Chord Monte", was also the first release by Quarterstick Records, an offshoot of Touch and Go Records. Steve Saylors dropped out in 1992 after job commitments prevented him from touring. Steve Albini, a longtime friend of the band, filled the bass slot on the "Fore" EP. Former Naked Raygun bassist Pierre Kezdy became the permanent bass player in 1994. After the reformation of Naked Raygun, Mike Thompson took over for Kezdy on bass.

Pegboy played a supposed "farewell" show on New Year's Eve in 1999, but then denied that it was really a "farewell" show a few years later when they returned to live performances.

Pegboy toured through the summer of 2009 with Face to Face and Polar Bear Club.

They have cited influences including Rites of Spring, Dag Nasty, Articles of Faith, Die Kreuzen, Ramones, Buzzcocks, the Replacements, the Effigies and Hüsker Dü.

Rise Against's Tim McIlrath, Alkaline Trio's Matt Skiba, as well as Hot Water Music's Chuck Ragan and Shai Hulud's Matt Fox are big Pegboy fans.

== Current members ==
- Larry Damore — vocals, guitar (1990–present)
- Joe Haggerty — drums (1990–present)
- John Haggerty — guitar (1990–present)
- Herb Rosen — bass (2022–present)

== Former members ==
- Steve Saylors — bass (1990-1992)
- J. Robbins — bass (1992, temporary replacement for the Social Distortion tour)
- Steve Albini — bass (1993 — on Fore) (died 2024)
- Pierre Kezdy — bass (1994-2007 ) (died 2020)
- "Skinny" Mike Thompson - bass (2007-2022)

== Discography ==
=== Albums ===
- 1991 - Strong Reaction (Quarterstick)
- 1994 - Earwig (Quarterstick)
- 1997 - Cha Cha Damore (Quarterstick)

=== Singles and EPs ===
- 1990 - Three-Chord Monte EP (Quarterstick)
- 1991 - "Field of Darkness"/"Walk on By" 7" (Quarterstick)
- 1993 - Fore EP (Quarterstick)
- 1996 - Dangermare (Split with Kepone) 7" (Quarterstick)

=== Compilation appearances ===
- 1995 - Vagabonds Of The Midwestern World: Fighting Songs By Thin Lizzy (Anti-Gravity) (1995) - "Emerald"
- 1995 - Hear Ya! Winter 1994-1995-The Caroline Distribution CD Sampler (Caroline) - "Sinner Inside"
- 1998 - Touch And Go & Quarterstick Records (Touch And Go/Quarterstick/Boa) - "Dog Dog"
- 1999 - Of Things To Come (Better Youth Organization) - "Fade Away"
- 2000 - Magnetic Curses: A Chicago Punk Rock Compilation (Thick) - "Chutes And Ladders"

=== Tribute to ===
- 2006 - The World I Know-A Tribute To Pegboy (Underground Communique)

== Videography ==
- "Sinner Inside"
- "Strong Reaction"
- "Through My Fingers"

== Reception ==
- "With roots in such seminal Chicago bands as Naked Raygun and Effigies, Pegboy sounds as if it would have been right at home during the punk upheaval of the late `70s." (Greg Kot, Chicago Tribune, 1991)
- "A barrage of industrial-strength noise from the North blasted through Liberty Lunch on Saturday, when the Jesus Lizard and Pegboy combined with Kepone for a galvanizing concert that brought their autumn tour to a close. All three record for Chicago's fiercely independent Touch and Go combine, which specializes in abrasive guitars over relentless rhythms and a minimum of melody." (Don McLeese, Austin American-Statesman, 1994)
- "The band has a knack for writing anthemic choruses in the tradition of guitarist John Haggerty's former band, Naked Raygun."(Review of Strong Reaction, Greg Kot, Chicago Tribune, 1991)
- "This workmanlike band inherits the Chicago muscle 'n' melody tradition of Naked Raygun." (Review of Earwig, Greg Kot, Chicago Tribune, 1995)
