= Didjits =

American punk rock band

- Also known as: UXB
- Origin: Mattoon, Illinois, United States
- Genres: Punk rock, hardcore punk, rock and roll
- Years active: 1981–1994; 2006; 2025–present
- Labels: Bam Bam Records; Touch and Go Records
- Members: Rick Sims; Billy Fury; Beanz Decatur
- Past members: Doug Evans; Brad Sims; Bob Williams; Mike Rankin; Todd Cole; Rey Washam
- Website: www.touchandgorecords.com

Didjits are an American punk rock band formed in Mattoon, Illinois in 1981, composed of Rick Sims on guitar/vocals, Doug Evans on bass, and Rick's brother Brad Sims, on drums. Didjits were known for the aggressive guitar playing and persona of Rick Sims, who often baited the audience between songs, and took plenty of abuse for it. Moreover, the band also added odd stunts and theatrical bits to some of their stage shows, particularly when playing in Chicago and Champaign.

They released their first album in 1986 on Bam Bam Records and disbanded in 1994, but briefly reunited in 2006. Brad Sims left the band in 1992. Former Scratch Acid drummer Rey Washam filled in for the Little Miss Carriage EP, and Todd Cole eventually took over as the drummer. Their song "Killboy Powerhead" was covered by The Offspring on their breakthrough 1994 album Smash.

== Early years ==
The earliest incarnation of Didjits was known as UXB, founded in 1981. The group featured Rick Sims on drums, and occasionally vocals and guitar, Doug Evans on guitar, and Mike Rankin on vocals and bass. The group performed locally and a few demos, but no recordings were released until 2024. By 1983, the group was reformed as Didjits with Sims now permanently on guitar, now accompanied by his brother, Brad Sims, on drums. Other early members included Rankin, as well as Bob Williams on bass before the lineup solidified with Rick Sims on vocals and Doug Evans on bass. The group recorded and distributed three demo tapes in 1985-1986 (Durga! Durga! Durga!, Whoop My Head, and Signifies My Go-T!) before embarking on recording their debut album.

== Recording history ==
Fizzjob, their debut album, was produced by Iain Burgess (who has worked with Naked Raygun, Effigies and Mega City Four, among others). Many of the songs on the album (and a couple subsequent releases) had appeared on self-released cassettes such as Whoop My Head and Signifies My Go-T. The album showcased the burgeoning songwriting talents of Rick Sims, along with his fast, stinging guitar leads. They played their souped up rock and roll with plenty of speed. Underneath the fun and fury, the band displayed a real feel for classic rock forms from Jerry Lee Lewis (spoofed and honored in the opening cut "Jerry Lee") to Ramones to AC/DC and others. Highlights include the dynamic "Fix Some Food Bitch", the melodic "California Surf Queen", the dramatic "Mexican Death Horse" and the smart ass "Beast Le Brutale".

Hey Judester, the follow-up album, was a big step forward, as the band, produced by Burgess again, was noticeably tighter and the production was accordingly beefed up. Furthermore, the Rick Didjit persona was truly crystallized, with sarcastic lyrics about bad asses, big cars, and fish dominating the proceedings. Considered by many fans to be the band's best album, the LP kicks off with the furious "Max Wedge" and segues directly into "Stingray". The first side also has the Cramps-like "Skull Baby", the lightning fast "Plate in My Head", sung from the point of view of a Vietnam vet, the heavy "Under the Christmas Fish", a frequent concert opener with its pounding bass and drum rhythm and Sims hooky lead guitar line, and the closer, a wobbly version of Little Richard's "Lucille". Side two was nearly as good, with "Axhandle" sounding like a cross between AC/DC and Buzzcocks, "Joliet" encouraging singalongs, Doug Evans's bass dominating "King Carp", and Sims showing that he could pen a great mid-tempo song on "Dad" ("you know I really hate it/when you hit me with that belt"), a tough guy song tinged with melancholy. Judester was the band's first album released on Touch & Go Records, and was subsequently released as a two-for-one CD with Fizzjob.

The band's following solidified with the release of Hornet Pinata. The album was littered with memorable riffs and careening, pile-driving rhythms. It leads off with "Killboy Powerhead", later covered by The Offspring on their breakthrough album, Smash and includes covers of The MC5's "Call Me Animal" and Jimi Hendrix's "Foxy Lady", with bassist Doug Evans on lead vocals. The band shot a video for "Captain Ahab" which MTV refused to play due to drug references in the lyrics. Nevertheless, a clip of the video was shown on MTV's 120 Minutes show. The video for "Judge Hot Fudge" appeared in a season five episode of Beavis and Butt-head entitled "Choke"; the boys were not impressed.

== Reunions ==
All of the original members of the band appeared at the Touch and Go 25th anniversary celebration in Chicago, Illinois on September 9, 2006. The next weekend, the band played another reunion show in Champaign.

In late 2016, preparations were also underway for another reunion in 2017. However, due to the death of Evans at the end of 2016, this reunion was canceled.

In 2025, The Didjits were included in the announced lineup for Riot Fest in Chicago. And in 2026 were announced in the lineup for Caterwaul and Fiesta Destructo with an interview with NPR Illinois speaking about the reunion.

== Post-Didjits projects ==
Sims went on to work with the Lookingglass Theatre Company in Chicago and has his own business as a composer/sound designer. He is also the head sound designer at Niles West High School's Theatre department.

For a few years, Evans resided in the Austin, Texas area where he regularly performed with his band, Blöwer (now disbanded), built nitro dragsters, and raised his children Lola Evans and Dodge Evans. He died on December 28, 2016.

== Discography ==
=== Demo tapes ===
- Durga! Durga! Durga! (1985)
- Whoop My Head (1985)
- Signifies My GO-T! (1986)

=== Studio albums ===
- 1986 Fizzjob (Bam Bam Records, re-released by Touch & Go in 1989)
- 1988 Hey Judester (Touch and Go Records, CD release included Fizzjob)
- 1990 Hornet Piñata (T&G)
- 1991 Full Nelson Reilly (T&G)
- 1993 Que Sirhan Sirhan (T&G)

=== Live album ===
- Backstage Passout (1991)

=== Compilation album ===
- Strictly Dynamite: The Best of Didjits (2024)

=== Singles and EPs ===
- 1989 "Lovesicle" 7" (T&G)
- 1991 "Fuck the Pigs" 7" (T&G)
- 1992 "Little Miss Carriage!" EP (T&G)
- 1993 "Dear Junkie" / "Skull Baby" (Sub Pop Records Single of the Month Club)
- 1995 "Pigs!" Fear (Fear and Loathing)

=== Other appearances ===
- 1991 Virus 100 (Alternative Tentacles)
- 1992 "Something's Gone Wrong Again" (C/Z Records)
- 1994 "Live At Emo's" (Rise Records)

=== Video album ===
Year	Video album details
1992	Knocked Up: Released: 1992; Label: Touch And Go Video; Formats: VHS

=== Music videos ===
List of music videos, showing year released and director
Title	Year	Director(s)
"Melvin Takes a Dive"	1985	David Landis
"Loan Me a Buck"	1985	David Landis
"Beast Le Brutale"	1986	David Landis
"Max Wedge"	1988	Phil Harder
"Captain Ahab"	1990	Paul Andresen
"Sweet Sweet Satan"	1990	Paul Andresen, Jay Bellissimo, David Landis, Rick Sims
"Top Fuel"	1991	Paul Andresen
"Judge Hot Fudge"	1993	Paul Andresen, David Landis
