= Over the Overlords =

Studio album by Naked Raygun
- Released: August 2, 2021
- Genre: Punk rock
- Length: 41:51
- Label: Wax Trax!
- Producer: Steven Gillis; Naked Raygun

Naked Raygun chronology
Raygun...Naked Raygun (1990)	Over the Overlords (2021)

Over the Overlords is the sixth studio album by Chicago punk band Naked Raygun. It was released on August 2, 2021, on Wax Trax! Records. It is their first album in 31 years.

The album features an instrumental that appears in the first and last tracks, and occasionally as interludes throughout the album, mostly with a repeating drum line.

== Background ==
The album is notable for being the last release to feature bassist Pierre Kezdy, due to his death in October 2020. Although the album was released after Pierre's death, and also featured bassist Fritz Doreza, Pierre had recorded for the album prior to his death.

The album is also notable for being the first Naked Raygun album since 1990's Raygun...Naked Raygun, and the first release of new material since the series of singles the band released in 2009, 2010, and 2011.

In 2020, ProRawk Records released a compilation album titled ...On the Rawks, which featured the song "Broken Things". This would be the first release of a song from the album, although "Broken Things" would not be released as a single until November 19, 2021, along with a lyric video.

The album's first official single was "Living in the Good Times", which premiered as a music video on April 9, 2021. The music video features many fan-submitted clips of people singing the song in their homes, and contains a guest appearance from Daryl Wilson of The Bollweevils. It was filmed in and on the roof of Cobra Lounge in Chicago.

The song "Ode to Sean McKeough" is a tribute to former Cobra Lounge/All Rise Brewing owner and Riot Fest co-founder Sean McKeough, who died from a stroke in 2016.

== Track listing ==
All tracks are written by Naked Raygun.

Over the Overlords track listing
No.	Title	Length
1.	"Intro"	1:21
2.	"Go the Spoils"	0:47
3.	"Living in the Good Times"	3:54
4.	"Soul Hole Baby"	3:51
5.	"Vijay's Big Organ"	0:19
6.	"Superheroes"	2:40
7.	"Treat Me Unkind"	2:20
8.	"Suicide Bomb"	3:13
9.	"Broken Things"	3:45
10.	"Amishes"	3:25
11.	"Eric's Across the Street"	0:22
12.	"Black and Grey"	3:28
13.	"Ode to Sean McKeough"	2:42
14.	"Farewell to Arms"	4:13
15.	"Outro Outre"	5:31
Total length:		41:51

Note: The CD and vinyl releases do not feature "Intro", "Vijay's Big Organ", "Eric's Across the Street", or "Outro Outre" on the printed track listing.

Digital and CD bonus tracks
No.	Title	Length
16.	"Living in the Good Times" (Paul Barker Mix)	4:28
17.	"Knock Me Down" (live)	2:39
Total length:		48:58

Note: The live version of "Knock Me Down" is specified as "live in Chicago 2015" on physical releases.

Limited deluxe edition vinyl bonus tracks
No.	Title	Length
18.	"Treason" (live)
19.	"Peacemaker" (live)
20.	"Vanilla Blue" (live)

== Personnel ==
Naked Raygun

- Jeff Pezzati – vocals
- Eric Spicer – drums
- Pierre Kezdy – bass
- Bill Stephens – guitar
- Fritz Doreza – bass

Additional musicians and production

- Steven Gills – recording, engineering, mixing, production, additional keys
- Naked Raygun – production
- Mike Chicowicz – trumpet
- Henry Salgado – trombone
- Paul Mertens – tenor saxophone
- Vijay Tellis-Nayak – additional keys
- Morgan Spencer – backing vocals on "Suicide Bomb"
- Ted Jenson – mastering

Album art and design

- Mark Skillicorn – design
- Brian Trost – design
- Miguel Echemendia – cover illustration
