= Fore (EP) =

EP by Pegboy
- Released: October 18, 1993
- Recorded: June 1993 at Westonworld Studios, Chicago, Illinois
- Genre: Punk rock
- Length: 11:21
- Label: Quarterstick
- Producer: Steve Albini

Pegboy chronology
Strong Reaction (1991)	Fore (1993)	Earwig (1994)

Professional ratings
Review scores
Source	Rating
Allmusic	3.5/5 stars

Fore is an EP by the punk rock band Pegboy. It was released in 1993 on Quarterstick Records.

== Track listing ==
All tracks are written by Pegboy.

No.	Title	Length
1.	"Never a Question"	3:03
2.	"Witnessed"	2:30
3.	"Minutes to Hours"	2:22
4.	"Jesus Christ"	3:26

== Personnel ==
Pegboy

- Larry Damore – vocals
- Joe Haggerty – drums
- John Haggerty – guitar

Production and additional personnel

- Steve Albini – bass guitar, production, engineering
- Paul Kozal – photography
