= Hey Judester =

Studio album by Didjits
- Released: 1988
- Genre: Rock
- Length: 26:10
- Label: Touch and Go
- Producer: Iain Burgess, Didjits

Didjits chronology
Fizzjob (1986)	Hey Judester (1988)	Hornet Piñata (1990)

Hey Judester is the second album by Didjits, released in 1988 through Touch and Go Records.

== Critical reception ==
Professional ratings
Review scores
Source	Rating
AllMusic	3.5/5 stars

The Windsor Star called the album "a brash, often funny collage of rock styles that at least shows Didjits is a band that has fun while it works." The Toronto Star deemed it "a dog's breakfast of racial and sexist slurs set to a galloping, guitar-killer beat," noting that it was parody." The Chicago Sun-Times labeled it "the band's high point."

== Track listing ==
All tracks are written by Didjits, except "Lucille" by Al Collins and Little Richard.

Side one
No.	Title	Length
1.	"Max Wedge"	1:39
2.	"Stingray"	1:42
3.	"Plate in My Head"	1:49
4.	"(Mama Had A) Skull Baby"	2:53
5.	"Under the Christmas Fish"	3:19
6.	"Lucille"	2:09

Side two
No.	Title	Length
1.	"Joliet"	2:13
2.	"Axhandle"	2:00
3.	"Balls...Fire"	1:50
4.	"King Carp"	2:17
5.	"Stumpo Knee Grinder"	1:46
6.	"Dad"	2:34

CD version
No.	Title	Length
13.	"Jerry Lee"	2:35
14.	"Hafta Be Cool to Rule/Wingtips"	2:28
15.	"California Surf Queen"	2:24
16.	"Pet Funeral"	2:47
17.	"C'mon Bbay"	1:33
18.	"Fix Some Food Bitch"	2:21
19.	"Reflective Brain"	1:38
20.	"Beast le Brutale"	1:58
21.	"Mexican Death Horse"	1:56
22.	"Elvis' Corvette"	1:36

== Personnel ==
Didjits

- Doug Evans – bass guitar
- Brad Sims – drums
- Rick Sims – vocals, guitar

Production and additional personnel

- Iain Burgess – production
- Didjits – production
- David Landis – illustrations
