= Throb Throb =

Studio album by Naked Raygun
- Released: 1985
- Recorded: 1983
- Genre: Punk rock
- Length: 33:37 (reissue)
- Label: Homestead (original album); Quarterstick (reissue)
- Producer: Gomez Addams, Iain Burgess

Naked Raygun chronology
Basement Screams (1983)	Throb Throb (1985)	All Rise (1986)

Throb Throb is the debut studio album by American punk rock band Naked Raygun, released on Homestead Records in 1985. It was the first of the band's releases to feature the musicianship of John Haggerty whose guitar playing distinguished the band's sound during the 1980s. Quarterstick Records reissued the album in 1999, and added an early version of "Libido" as bonus material, which originally appeared on the "Flammable Solid" 7".

== Release ==
Naked Raygun had combined resources with other local bands, such as Big Black and the Effigies, to release records themselves under the name Ruthless Records. In 1983 they put out the Basement Screams EP and then, after a change of personnel, recorded the LP Throb Throb. Three songs from the album ""Surf Combat", "Gear" and a shorter version of "Libido") saw release on Naked Raygun's first single, Flammable Solid (a tribute to Stiff Little Fingers' first album Inflammable Material). With their signing to Homestead Records, the release of the full LP was delayed into the following year.

Throb Throb's lyric sheet was done up to resemble a blueprint with white text on a blue background, and on some versions of the LP the lyrics even appeared backwards in the style of an actual blueprint. The LP remained in print through the 1980s and was mastered onto CD. When Quarterstick Records rereleased the band's material in 1999, Homestead's original distributor issued 400 final copies of the LP on green vinyl.

The cover was created by Chicago comic book artist Mike Saenz.

== Reception ==
Professional ratings
Review scores
Source	Rating
AllMusic	4/5 stars

Spin wrote, "Delivering garage punk in chummy boys' voices surrounded by a low, bass-heavy beat and searing, fuzz-happy drones of guitar. Filtering America through a sinister-but fun sensibility is what Throb Throb is about." John Leland added, "Barring the Hüskers, no one has a stronger sense of roots and a greater affinity for pop hooks. Like most punks, the Rayguns write about sex and the military, but their lyrics are satisfying only for their underlying anger and not for their half-baked truisms."

== Track listing ==
1. "Rat Patrol" (Haggerty) – 2:13
2. "Surf Combat" (Gonzalez) – 1:13
3. "Gear" (Pezzati) – 2:47
4. "Metastasis" (Gonzalez) – 2:24
5. "Leeches" (Pezzati) – 3:17
6. "Roller Queen" (Pezzati/Haggerty) – 3:07
7. "On" (Gonzalez) - 0:28
8. "I Don't Know" (Haggerty/Pezzati) - 3:30
9. "Libido" (Colao) - 3:26
10. "No Sex" (Pezzati) - 1:52
11. "Only in America" (Durango/Colao) - 3:04
12. "Stupid" (Durango) - 1:10
13. "Managua" (Gonzalez) - 2:13

CD bonus track

14. "Libido (short)" (Colao) – 2:20

== Personnel ==
- Jeff Pezzati - vocals
- Camilo Gonzalez - bass
- John Haggerty - guitar, saxophone
- Jim Colao - drums
- Kristin Haggerty - piano (track 9)
