= Full Nelson Reilly =

Studio album by Didjits
- Released: April 19, 1991
- Genre: Hardcore punk
- Length: 27:50
- Label: Touch and Go
- Producer: Steve Albini

Didjits chronology
| Hornet Piñata (1990) | Full Nelson Reilly (1991) | Little Miss Carriage! (1992) |

Singles from Full Nelson Reilly
- 1. "Headless" Released: January 1991

Professional ratings
Review scores
| Source | Rating |
|---|---|
| Allmusic | 4.5/5 stars |

Full Nelson Reilly is the fourth album by Didjits, released on April 19, 1991 through Touch and Go Records. It was the last album to feature Brad Sims on the drums, and the first to feature Steve Albini as producer.

The track "Headless" was originally featured on the EP Fuck the Pigs in 1990. A music video was filmed for the song "Top Fuel" at Coles County Dragway USA.

== Track listing ==
All tracks are written by Didjits, except "Mr. DNA." by Gerald Casale and Mark Mothersbaugh.

| No. | Title | Length |
|---|---|---|
| 1. | "Top Fuel" | 2:53 |
| 2. | "Who's Ready to Get High" | 2:09 |
| 3. | "The Pot Thief" | 2:28 |
| 4. | "Headless" | 2:19 |
| 5. | "Lou Reed" | 1:51 |
| 6. | "Mr. DNA" | 2:42 |
| 7. | "Eat the Roach" | 2:00 |
| 8. | "Little White Trash" | 2:09 |
| 9. | "Freak Show" | 2:02 |
| 10. | "House on Haunted Hill" | 2:47 |
| 11. | "Weird Waxed and Wired" | 1:42 |
| 12. | "Promise Not to Kill Anybody" | 2:48 |

== Personnel ==
Didjits

- Doug Evans – bass guitar
- Brad Sims – drums
- Rick Sims – vocals, guitar

Production and additional personnel

- Steve Albini – production
- David Landis – cover art, design
