= Vic Bondi =

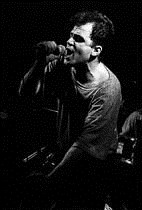
- Bondi in 1991

Background information
- Instruments: Guitar, vocals
- Years active: 1981–present
- Labels: Jade Tree Records; Alternative Tentacles; Your Choice Records

Vic Bondi is an American singer-songwriter and one of the founding members of political Chicago hardcore punk band Articles of Faith. He went on to form Alloy, and Jones Very after AoF's demise. At the time of AoF's original breakup Bondi was working as a history instructor at the University of Massachusetts Boston. Bondi's subsequent day jobs included working on Microsoft's Encarta as well as other projects in educational and media software. After a hiatus in the late 90s, Bondi resurfaced with new bands, Report Suspicious Activity and Dead Ending. He was featured in the documentaries American Hardcore and You Weren't There.

== Musical career ==
=== Early life ===
Bondi is the son of a U.S. Navy captain and his family moved frequently when he was young: by his own count, he moved to new homes twenty-two times before the age of eighteen. He graduated from the University of Illinois at Chicago in 1985 and earned a PhD in history at Boston University in 1992.

=== Articles of Faith ===
Bondi founded Articles of Faith in 1981. Originally called Direct Drive, the band changed its name and began to play thrash and hardcore after Bondi saw the Bad Brains at the 930 club in Washington, D.C., in 1981. Combining thrash, reggae, and noise, the group was notable for its political lyrics, three-guitar attack, and sponsorship of the Chicago scene. AoF released two EPs (What We Want is Free and Wait) and two LPs (Give Thanks and In This Life, both produced by Bob Mould, and toured North America several times from 1983 to 1985. Bondi had already left Chicago by the time AoF disbanded in 1985.

=== Other projects ===
Bondi was also the lead singer and guitarist of Jones Very and Alloy and later fronted Report Suspicious Activity which also featured J. Robbins of Channels, Jawbox, and Burning Airlines, Darren Zentek from Kerosene 454/Oswego/Channels, and Erik Denno from Kerosene 454, and released a record on Alternative Tentacles in 2005. Vic has also played with Tom Morello of Rage Against the Machine in a project called Weatherman. Bondi now fronts hardcore band Dead Ending with members of Rise Against, Alkaline Trio, Noise by Numbers & The Bomb. Dead Ending have released three EPs, a single and an LP. Bondi was also a participant in Reed Mullin's Teenage Time Killers project, recording on that album and appear in the band's Los Angeles showcase in 2015. In 2016, Bondi recruited Alloy drummer Colin Sears and released a solo album, Primary. They played a number of shows on the West Coast as "Black Theory." Dead Ending also released a highly charged political single, "Ivanka Wants Her Orange Back"/"Class War" in time for the election. In 2017, Bondi resumed recording and playing with Report Suspicious Activity, and they and Dead Ending both released records that year. He also played a number of live shows, with both bands, and solo acoustic.

=== Redshift and solo acoustic (2022– 2025) ===
Vic Bondi (guitar, vocals) formed the Seattle surfpunk band Redshift in 2019 with Michael Catts (bass, vocals) and Adam Gross (drums). Redshift is described as a "surf band for the apocalypse" and play aggressive surfpunk—a mix of surf-style instrumentals and traditional punk rock numbers. After being sidelined by the pandemic, Redshift is again playing live shows in 2022 in support of their forthcoming album (November 2022) on Boss Tuneage Records, which will be titled, "The Worst Timeline Possible."

Bondi also continues to play solo acoustic shows, including a set of Pacific Northwest dates in 2022 opening for his longtime friend, Bob Mould.

=== Vic Bondi And His Issues (2026) ===
In 2026, Vic Bondi And His Issues was formed in Seattle with the name being a suggestion by his longtime friend and Alternative Tentacles Records owner Jello Biafra. The band consists of Vic Bondi (lead guitar/vocals), Tully Potter (bass), Adam Dahlquist (drums), and Fred Speakman (rhythm guitar). The band came out of the gate with a hardcore-forward sound and a 5-track EP that Havoc Undground in its review says "hits hard with an infectious punk rock energy."

The Alternative Tentacles press release for the EP states that Bondi is "responding to new emergencies" rather than "revisiting old battegrounds" and showcases the bridge on the explosive Sun God as what Bondi hopes listeners take away.

This is a moment

The firmness of purpose

Mainfest kindness

And abolute justice.

== Discography ==
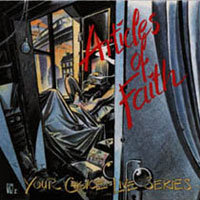
Your Choice Live Series 022 (1994)

=== With Articles of Faith ===
- What We Want is Free EP (Affirmation, 1982)
- Wait EP (Affirmation, 1983)
- Give Thanks (Reflex, 1984)
- In This Life (Lone Wolf, 1985)
- Core (Bitzcore, 1991)
- Your Choice Live Series 022 (Your Choice Records, 1994)
- Complete, Vol. One (Alternative Tentacles, 2004)
- Complete, Vol. Two (Alternative Tentacles, 2004)
- New Normal Catastrophe LP (Alternative Tentacles, 2012)

Compilation and soundtrack appearances

- "Buried Alive" and "False Security" on the Master Tape compilation LP (Affirmation Records, 1982)
- "Five O'Clock" - On The Middle of America compilation LP (H.I.D. Productions, 1984)
- "Up Against The Wall" on the P.E.A.C.E. compilation LP (R Radical Records, 1985)
- "Buy this War" and "American Dreams" on the Fortunate Son split EP (2 songs by AoF and Vic Bondi performing one original and one cover song solo) (Alternative Tentacles, 2003)
- "Bad Attitude" on the American Hardcore - The History Of American Punk Rock 1980-1986 original documentary soundtrack (Rhino Records, 2006)
- "I Got Mine" on the You Weren't There: A History Of Chicago Punk 1977-1984 documentary soundtrack (Factory 25, 2009)

=== As himself ===
- The Ghost Dances (Bitzcore, 1988)
- Garza, Missouri EP (A to Z media 2015)
- Primary (Wasteland, 2016)
- In Hope And Fear (Self-Released, 2022)

Compilation appearances

- For A Fistful Of Yens! (Bitzcore/Indigo/Century Media, 1994) - "Don't Turn Away"
- Ox-Compilation #16-Destroy! 7-inch EP (Ox Fanzine, 1994) - "Chain Of Graves"
- Different Notes (Notes Music, 1995) - "Don't Turn Away"
- Fortunate Son split EP with Articles of Faith (Alternative Tentacles, 2003) - "Hardball", "Fortunate Son"
- Go Contrary, Go Sing (Made in Brooklyn, 2005) - "Blues For Sophie"
- Lean Into It-A Tribute to Die Kreuzen (Erosion, 2005) - "Enemies"
- The World I Know: A Tribute To Pegboy (Underground Communique, 2006) - "Method"

=== With Jones Very ===
- Words and Days (Hawker/Roadrunner, 1989)
- Radio Wave (Bitzcore, 1991)
- Trains of Thought 7-inch single (Jade Tree Records, 1991)
- "Straight Time" /"Ideas New Tomorrow" 7-inch single (Bitzcore, 1991)
- New Life For Lies (Jade Tree, 1992)

Compilation appearances

- The New Breed cassette (Roadrunner, 1989) - "Words And Days", "Rest You Know Too Well"
- For A Fistful Of Yeng! (Bitzcore/Indigo, 1994) - "Straight Time"
- Jade Tree-First Five Years 2XCD (Jade Tree, 2000) - "No More", "It Comes Around", "What She Told Me", "Idea New Tomorrow", "Feet Of Clay", "Fugitive Time"

=== With Alloy ===
- "Untitled" b/w "Hard Rain" 7-inch single (Plastic Distribution, 1992)
- Eliminate (Bitzcore, 1992)
- Alloy (Engine, 1993)
- "Reading Blind" b/w "Eliminate" 7-inch single (Engine, 1993)
- "Razor Wire" on split 7-inch with Bob Evans (Skene!, 1994)
- Paper Thin Front MiniAlbum (Engine, 1994)

Compilation appearances

- Chairman Of The Board-Interpretations Of Songs Made Famous By Frank Sinatra 2XCD (Grass, 1993) - "One More For My Baby"
- Life Is Too Short For Boring Music Vol. III (EFA, 1993) - "Absurd"
- Sampler Spring 1993 (Caroline Distribution, 1993) - "Reading Blind"
- Case Closed? (An International Compilation Of Hüsker Dü Cover Songs) (Snoop, 1994) -"Out On A Limb"
- For A Fistful Of Yens! (Bitzcore/Indigo, 1994) - "More Alone With You"
- Strange Notes! A Germs Cover Compilation (Bitzcore, 1994) - "My Tunno
- I Hear Ya! Winter 1994-1995 - The Caroline Distribution CD Sampler (Caroline, 1995) - "Allegheny"
- So You Wanna Be A Rock 'N' Roll Compilation? (Bitzcore, 1995) - "Graduate", "Who Bought The Con"

=== With Report Suspicious Activity ===
- Report Suspicious Activity (Alternative Tentacles, 2005)
- Dreamland EP (Underground Communiqué, 2006)
- Destroy All Evidence (Alternative Tentacles, 2008)
- Leviathan (Arctic Rodeo, 2017)
- "The Wilderness" b/w "Just 'Cos You Got The Power" 7-inch single (Arctic Rodeo, 2018)

Compilation appearances

- Stay Sick In '06 (Alternative Tentacles, 2006) - "Subtle"
- Alternative Tentacles (Pasżaer, 2010) - "Bush Is Brezhniev"

=== With Dead Ending ===
- DE EP (Alternative Temtacles, 2012)
- DE II EP (Alternative Tentacles, 2013)
- DE III EP (Bridge Nine, 2014)
- "Class War" b/w "Ivanka Wants Her Orange Back" 7-inch single (Alternative Tentacles, 2016)
- Shoot The Messenger (Alternative Tentacles, 2017)
- "(It's Not) What You Believe" b/w "Painkiller" 7-inch single (Alternative Tentacles, 2018)
- "American Virus" b/w "Walter Benjamin At The Door" 7-inch single (Alternative Tentacles, 2020)

Compilation appearances

- Ox Compilation #106 (Ox Fanzine, 2013) - "Infinite Detention"
- Ox Compilation #136 (Ox Fanzine, 2018) - "Bring On The Mob"
