= Bhopal Stiffs =

Chicago-based hardcore punk rock band

The Bhopal Stiffs was an American hardcore punk band formed in Chicago in 1985 by singers/guitarists Larry Damore and Vince Marine, bassist Steve Saylors, and drummer Dave Schleitwiler. The band name is a reference to an ecological disaster which took place in Bhopal, India in 1984. Honing a melodic, mid-tempo approach very much in tune with the prevailing Windy City punk sound of the period, the group gigged steadily, in time becoming the de facto house band at the Chicago bar Exit. In 1987, the Bhopal Stiffs recorded a ten-song demo tape, with the single "Not Just My Head" following on the Dazit label later that year and played gigs in Indiana, Wisconsin, St Louis and many shows in Chicago. Marine exited the lineup in early 1988, with guitarist Ron Lowe stepping in and Larry Damore assuming sole vocal duties; the reconfigured group recorded the six-song E.P.A. record, issued on the Roadkill label. After contributing "Too Much Pain" to the There's a Fungus Among Us compilation, the Bhopal Stiffs disbanded in 1989; Larry Damore and Steve Saylors later formed Pegboy with former Naked Raygun guitarist John Haggerty, while Dave Schleitwiler went on to play drums for local groups Buzzmuscle and The Indicators, amongst others, and Ron Lowe became a recording engineer at the Chicago Recording Company. Harmless Records later compiled the Stiffs' complete recorded output on the CD 1985-1989. The band played reunion shows in 2001 and 2010.

== History & Breakup ==
All four original of the Bhopal Stiffs lived in the general Brookfield/Riverside/LaGrange area growing up. Vince and Larry, despite being on the wrestling team together in high school, weren't close friends until they both met by chance at Illinois State University. There Vince & Larry would jam and after Larry dropped out of ISU they met up with Dave (who went to grade school with Vince) to get a band started. In the process of trying to find a bassist, one of the women who tried out suggested Steve to the group. The four of them began as a cover band called Blue Youth - doing covers of bands like The Cure. After decided they wanted to play their own music they briefly entertained the name The Shuttle Stiffs before deciding to go with Bhopal.

For a while the band was practicing 5 days a week yet never playing out. They finally played their first show was at Exit, where the band members were regulars and friends of the staff. After a while the Bhopal Stiff became an Exit house band, playing shows frequently and filling in time slots when needed. Joe Patelco (spelling), a manager at Exit, offered and eventually financed the making of the 7-inch. The band went into Chicago Recording Company with Iain Burgess in 1987 to record a ten-song demo, two songs of which ended up on their 7-inch.

Tensions and bickering came to a head when guitarist and co-songwriter Vince Marine was kicked out of the band and replaced by Ron Lowe in 1988. They went back to CRC with Iain to record the EPA EP. After Vince left the spark and dedication for the band waned rapidly and the band was going through the motions, eventually breaking up in 1989. Larry, Steve and Dave started jamming with John Haggerty, who had just left Naked Raygun and joined a few of the Stiffs practice sessions. When things fizzled with the Stiffs the earliest incarnation of Pegboy was formed. It was not to be for Dave however, as John wanted to play with his brother Joe Haggerty, who became the drummer for the band.

== Reunion Shows ==
In 2001, all the members of the Bhopal Stiffs (including Vince & Ron) did reunion show at the Fireside Bowl. In 2010 they played a show at Subterranean as part of Riot Fest.

== Members ==
- Larry Damore - Vocals/Guitar (1985–1989)
- Vince Marine - Vocals/Guitar (1985–1988)
- Ron Lowe - Guitar (1988–1989)
- Steve Saylors - Bass (1985–1989)
- Dave Schleitwiler - Drums (1985–1989)

== Discography ==
=== Studio releases ===
- "Not Just My Head" b/w "One Track Head" 7" single (Dazit) (1987)
- E.P.A. 12" EP (Roadkill) (1988)
- 1985-1989 CD (Harmless) (2001) - Complete recorded output plus live material

=== Compilation appearances ===
- Redline Distribution Volume 1 CD (Redline) (2001) - "Too Many Things"
- Consumer Blackmail 2 cassette (Straight Time) (1988) - "I Want Off", "No Future"
- Greenearth Vol. 3 cassette (Greenearth) (1988) - "Born Again", "Fun At The Beach"
- Just A Big Healthy Girl cassette (Flush) (1988) - "Born Again", "No Future"
- There's A Fungus Amongus 7" EP (What The Fuck) (1989) - "Too Much Pain"
- Cream Of The Crap cassette (Flush) (1989) - "No Future"
- Don't Ask and You Won't Have to Be Told cassette (Bay of Piglets) (1990) - "Not Just My Head"
- No Respect 'Til Vinyl cassette (Flush) (n/a) - "Drunken Stupor", "Fun At The Beach"
- Destroy All Masters cassette (Fuckface Tapes) (n/a) - "I Came For You", "Drunken Stupor", "Fun At The Beach", "Capetown Youth", "Pay To Play"
