= Raygun...Naked Raygun =

Studio album by Naked Raygun
- Released: 1990
- Genre: Hardcore punk; punk rock; post-punk
- Length: 48:36
- Label: Caroline
- Producer: Keith Auerbach, Naked Raygun

Naked Raygun chronology
Understand? (1989)	Raygun...Naked Raygun (1990)	Free Shit! (2001)

Raygun...Naked Raygun is the fifth studio album by Chicago punk rock band Naked Raygun, released in 1990 through Caroline Records. The album was recorded at Chicago Trax and was co-produced by Keith Harbacher and the band. It was the band's first album with their new guitarist Bill Stephens, who had replaced John Haggerty. This was the last album by the band before they broke up in 1992.

== Reception ==
Professional ratings
Review scores
Source	Rating
AllMusic	2/5 stars

- "The band's fifth album sounds like the culmination of some of the ideas explored on Jettison and Understand?. The trick is to maintain the original hard edge, and on Raygun...Naked Raygun the band pulls it off. Pierre Kezdy's bass sounds like a power tool and Eric Spicer excavates a groove with his explosive drumming, while new guitarist Bill Stephens adds tonal color. As usual, vocalist Jeff Pezzati delivers the angst without histrionics." (Greg Kot, Chicago Tribune)
- "Bill Stephens joined and the fresh blood resulted in one last, stellar album, 1990's Raygun...Naked Raygun" (Jim DeRogatis, Chicago Sun-Times)
- "This is fast and hard enough that the band's hardcore past is never in doubt, but the emphasis is on infectious shout-along rockers in the Brit-punk football-cheer tradition. All four members are songwriters, and have produced a solid set of hard-edged wallopers." (Mark Jenkins, The Washington Post)
- "Without Haggerty' s presence, Raygun is dry, forever tripping on its own feet. The passion and cross-cutting tension of early Naked Raygun records don't make it on to Raygun." (Bob Gendron, AllMusic)
- "Though the band rejects the hardcore tag as too limiting, its new Raygun...Naked Raygun album remains true to supersonic form and promises an earsplitting assault when the band appears Wednesday night at the Cannibal Club." (Austin American-Statesman)

== Track listing ==
No.	Title	Writer(s)	Length
1.	"Home"	Pierre Kezdy	2:53
2.	"Fever Island"	Jeff Pezzati, Eric Spicer, Bill Stephens	2:39
3.	"The Grind"	Jeff Pezzati	3:49
4.	"Jazz Gone Bad"	Jeff Pezzati	4:27
5.	"Prepare to Die"	Pierre Kezdy	2:51
6.	"The Promise"	Bill Stephens	2:21
7.	"Holding You"	Pierre Kezdy, Jeff Pezzati	5:13
8.	"Strange Days"	Pierre Kezdy	3:19
9.	"In My Head"	Jeff Pezzati	3:54
10.	"Camarilla"	Eric Spicer	3:35
11.	"Terminal"	Jeff Pezzati, Bill Stephens	5:24

1999 CD re-issue bonus tracks
No.	Title	Writer(s)	Length
12.	"Last Drink"	Nic Austin	2:32
13.	"Love Battery"	Howard Devoto, Pete Shelley	2:17
14.	"Running Free"	Steve Diggle	3:22

== Personnel ==
Naked Raygun

- Jeff Pezzati – vocals
- Pierre Kezdy – bass guitar
- Eric Spicer – drums
- Bill Stephens – guitar

Production and additional personnel

- Keith Auerbach – production
- Marc Harris – photography
- Naked Raygun – production
- Mike Saenz – illustrations
- Kevin Weppner – alto saxophone on "Holding You"
- Mars Williams – tenor saxophone on "Holding You"
