= Retsepti =

Georgian rock band

Retsepti რეცეპტი
- Origin: Tbilisi, Georgian Soviet Socialist Republic, Soviet Union (Now Tbilisi, Georgia)
- Genres: Post-punk, darkwave, alternative rock
- Years active: 1987–1992
- Labels: Supreme Echo, Tian An Men 89
- Past members: Lado Burduli; Zaza Sakhamberidze; Vova Vardaniani; Kakha Gugushvili "Jozef"; Shalva Khakhanashvili; Sandro Kapanadze "Kirpicha"

Retsepti (Georgian: რეცეპტი) was a Georgian post-punk/dark wave band which existed in 1987–1992. It influenced the local music scene and attracted international attention.

== History ==
By the end of 1980 the rock underground was born in the Georgian SSR, with hard rock being more popular in Kutaisi and post-punk in Tbilisi.

The band Retsepti was founded in 1987 in the capital by its front-man Lado Burduli.

Retsepti released one album and then disbanded.

In 2006, the archival record label Supreme Echo released a compilation of their music as "Anthology Of Georgian Underground: Retsepti 1987-1992".

After the breakup of the band Burduli performed as an actor and TV presenter and was involved in the organization of rock festivals.

== Line-up ==
- Lado Burduli - Guitar/Vocal;
- Zaza Sakhamberidze - Guitar/Back Vocal;
- Vova Vardaniani – Drums;
- Kakha "Jozef" Gugushvili – Bass;
- Shalva Khakhanashvili – Piano;
- Sandro "Kirpicha" Kapanadze – Saxophone

== Reception ==
In both Bandcamp Daily and Post Pravda Magazine the band was called "legendary" and their music described as "dark". Retsepti was called "one of the most influential bands in the Georgian underground" by Polish blog Muzika - Komunika.

== See also ==
- List of post-punk bands
