= Que Sirhan Sirhan =

Studio album by Didjits
- Released: 1993
- Genre: Hardcore punk
- Length: 23:50
- Label: Touch and Go
- Producer: Steve Albini

Didjits chronology
Little Miss Carriage! (1992)	Que Sirhan Sirhan (1993)

Que Sirhan Sirhan is the final studio album by the American band Didjits, released in 1993 through Touch and Go Records. The band supported the album with a North American tour.

A music video was made for "Judge Hot Fudge".

== Production ==
"Monkey Suit" is a cover of a song by the Plasmatics. "Agent 99" is about the Get Smart character. Todd Cole replaced Rey Washam on drums.

== Critical reception ==
Professional ratings
Review scores
Source	Rating
AllMusic	4.5/5 stars
Chicago Sun-Times	3.5/4 stars

The Washington Post wrote: "Aside from the mid-tempo, vaguely bluesy 'Sick of My Fix', these 11 songs are little more than a blur—a chord progression, a hyperdrive beat, a bellowed refrain—but that little more is just enough to make them engaging." The Chicago Tribune called the album "a hot rod to cheap thrill punk rock hell."

== Track listing ==
All tracks are written by Didjits, except "Monkey Suit" by Danny Axeman and Richie Stotts.

No.	Title	Length
1.	"Agent 99"	1:55
2.	"Judge Hot Fudge"	1:54
3.	"Spicy Little Outfit"	2:03
4.	"Que Sirhan Sirhan"	3:02
5.	"Sister Sin"	2:08
6.	"Fire in the Hole"	1:49
7.	"Evilized"	1:36
8.	"Sick of My Fix"	2:35
9.	"Turn It Up"	1:42
10.	"Monkey Suit"	2:34
11.	"Barely Legal"	2:32

== Personnel ==
Didjits

- Todd Cole – drums
- Doug Evans – bass guitar
- Rick Sims (a.k.a. Rick Didjit) – vocals, guitar

Production and additional personnel

- Steve Albini – production
- David Landis – cover art, design
