= Jettison (album) =

Studio album by Naked Raygun
- Released: May 1988
- Recorded: Jericho Studio & Chicago Recording Company, Chicago
- Genre: Hardcore punk
- Length: 32:55
- Label: Caroline Records
- Producer: Iain Burgess, Naked Raygun, Larry Sturm

Naked Raygun chronology
All Rise (1986)	Jettison (1988)	Understand? (1989)

Professional ratings
Review scores
Source	Rating
Allmusic	4.5/5 stars

Jettison is the third studio album by Chicago punk band Naked Raygun, released on Caroline Records in 1988.

== Track listing ==
All songs written by Naked Raygun, except for "Suspect Device" by Stiff Little Fingers.

No.	Title	Length
1.	"Soldiers Requiem"	4:14
2.	"When the Walls Come Down"	2:21
3.	"Walk in Cold"	2:23
4.	"Jettison"	0:59
5.	"Live Wire"	3:39
6.	"The Mule"	3:05
7.	"Coldbringer"	2:33
8.	"Blight"	2:05
9.	"Free Nation"	3:20
10.	"Hammer Head"	2:31
11.	"Ghetto Mechanic"	2:56
12.	"Suspect Device (Live)"	2:45

1999 CD re-issue bonus tracks
No.	Title	Length
13.	"Vanilla Blue (originally appeared on the "Vanilla Blue" single)"	3:10
14.	"The Strip (Live)"	1:38
15.	"Roller Queen (Live)"	3:44
16.	"Backlash Jack (Live)"	2:53

== Personnel ==
Naked Raygun

- John Haggerty – guitar, saxophone
- Pierre Kezdy – bass guitar
- Jeff Pezzati – vocals
- Eric Spicer – drums

Additional musicians and production

- Grant Austin – engineering
- Karen Bemis – photography
- John Bergin – illustrations
- Iain Burgess – production, recording
- Cosaro Productions – art direction
- Naked Raygun – production
- Timothy R. Powell – recording
- Larry Sturm – production
- Bryan Willette – illustrations
