= So (band) =

English music duo

So were an English duo from London that was active in the late 1980s, that featured Marcus Bell and Mark Long, who were members of new wave band The Opposition. The duo were managed by Steve Weltman of Esta Management, and were contemporaries of acts such as Climie Fisher and Waterfront. Signed to Parlophone, they released singles such as "Are You Sure?" (which charted in the UK at number 62 and U.S. at number 41) and "Would You Die for Me", as well as the accompanying album Horseshoe in the Glove, produced by Walter Turbitt. So only lasted for one album as The Opposition regrouped to release the album Blue Alice Blue in 1990.

Marcus Bell died from cancer in December 2014. Mark Long died from cancer aged 67 in 2022.

== Discography ==
=== Album ===
- Horseshoe in the Glove (1988)

Track listing:

1. "Are You Sure?"
2. "Dreaming"
3. "Burning Bush"
4. "Horseshoe in the Glove"
5. "Capitol Hill"
6. "Tips on Crime"
7. "Villains"
8. "Would You Die for Me"

=== Singles ===
- "Burning Bush" / "Dreaming (Cocktail Mix)" (1988)
- "Would You Die for Me" / "Spies at Home" (1988)
- "Are You Sure" / "Don't Look Back" (1988)
- "Capitol Hill (John Luongo Mix)" / "Don't Look Back" (1988 - US only)
