= Little Miss Carriage! =

EP by Didjits
- Released: October 2, 1992
- Genre: Hardcore punk
- Length: 11:00
- Label: Touch and Go
- Producer: Steve Albini

Didjits chronology
Full Nelson Reilly (1991)	Little Miss Carriage! (1992)	Que Sirhan Sirhan (1993)

Professional ratings
Review scores
Source	Rating
Allmusic	3/5 stars

Little Miss Carriage! is an EP by the hardcore punk band, Didjits, released on October 2, 1992, through Touch and Go Records. It was the first to not feature Rick Sims's brother, Brad Sims, on drums.

== Track listing ==
All tracks are written by Didjits.

No.	Title	Length
1.	"Dirt County Road"	2:28
2.	"The Man"	1:59
3.	"Jimmy"	2:28
4.	"Rock the Nation"	2:41
5.	"Sugarfox"	1:48
Total length:		11:00

== Personnel ==
Didjits

- Doug Evans – bass guitar, vocals (Sugarfox only)
- Rick Sims (a.k.a. Rick Dijit) – Vocals, guitar
- Rey Washam – drums

Production and additional personnel

- Steve Albini – production
- Mary Perez – photography
