= Cha Cha Damore =

Studio album by Pegboy
- Released: October 14, 1997
- Genre: Punk rock
- Length: 29:14
- Label: Quarterstick
- Producer: Steve Albini

Pegboy chronology
Earwig (1994)	Cha Cha Damore (1997)

Professional ratings
Review scores
Source	Rating
AllMusic	2/5 stars

Cha Cha Damore is the third album by Pegboy. It was released on October 14, 1997, through Quarterstick Records.

== Critical reception ==
Ox-Fanzine wrote that "the Pegboy variant of melodic guitar punk deliberately aims to avoid catchy tralala schemes." The Wisconsin State Journal wrote that "on each successive recording, the Chicago band's upbeat, elemental pop punk rock sounds ever more invigorating." The Chicago Reader called Cha Cha Damore the band's best album.

== Track listing ==
All tracks are written by Pegboy, except "Surrender" by Rick Nielsen.

No.	Title	Length
1.	"Dangerwood"	2:07
2.	"Can't Give"	2:35
3.	"You Fight Like a Little Girl"	2:46
4.	"Dangermare"	2:39
5.	"Dog, Dog"	3:26
6.	"Liberace Hat Trick"	2:46
7.	"Dangerace"	1:51
8.	"Hey, Look, I'm a Cowboy"	2:45
9.	"In the Pantry of the Mountain King"	2:50
10.	"Surrender"	3:41
11.	"Planet Porno"	1:48

== Personnel ==
Pegboy

- Larry Damore – vocals
- Joe Haggerty – drums
- John Haggerty – guitar
- Pierre Kezdy – bass guitar

Production and additional personnel

- Steve Albini – production, engineering
