= Understand? =

Studio album by Naked Raygun
- Released: 1989
- Studios: Tanglewood, Brookfield, Illinois
- Genre: Punk rock
- Length: 39:05
- Label: Caroline
- Producers: Larry Sturm, Naked Raygun

Naked Raygun chronology
Jettison (1988)	Understand? (1989)	Raygun...Naked Raygun (1990)

Understand? is the fourth studio album by Chicago post-hardcore band Naked Raygun, released in 1989 through Caroline Records. "Hip Swingin'" is about the United States involving itself in the affairs of South American countries.

== Critical reception ==
Professional ratings
Review scores
Source	Rating
AllMusic	2/5 stars
Chicago Tribune	3/4 stars

The Chicago Tribune wrote that "slam-dance rhythms and shout-from-the-rooftops choruses again predominate." Trouser Press called the album "a compelling array of martial chants and supercharged rockers."

== Track listing ==
No.	Title	Writer(s)	Length
1.	"Treason"	John Haggerty, Pierre Kezdy	4:23
2.	"Hips Swingin'"	Jeff Pezzati	2:47
3.	"Understand?"	Haggerty	2:30
4.	"Entrapment"	Pezzati	2:45
5.	"Bughouse"	Kezdy	3:11
6.	"Wonder Beer"	Haggerty, Eric Spicer	2:58
7.	"Never Follow"	Haggerty	2:16
8.	"Too Much of You"	Pezzati	1:49
9.	"Vagabond Dog"	Kezdy	3:30
10.	"O.K. Wait"	Kezdy	2:17
11.	"The Sniper Song"	Spicer	1:35
12.	"Which Side You're On"	Pezzati	2:43

1999 CD re-issue bonus tracks
No.	Title	Writer(s)	Length
13.	"Mr. Gridlock"	Pezzati	3:08
14.	"I Don't Know"	Haggerty, Pezzati	3:13

== Personnel ==
Naked Raygun

- John Haggerty – guitar
- Pierre Kezdy – bass guitar
- Jeff Pezzati – vocals
- Eric Spicer – drums

Production and additional personnel

- Phil Hale – illustrations
- Marc Harris – photography
- Ellie Hughes – design
- Tom Hughes – design
- Naked Raygun – production
- Larry Sturm – production
