= The Opposition (band) =

English post-punk band

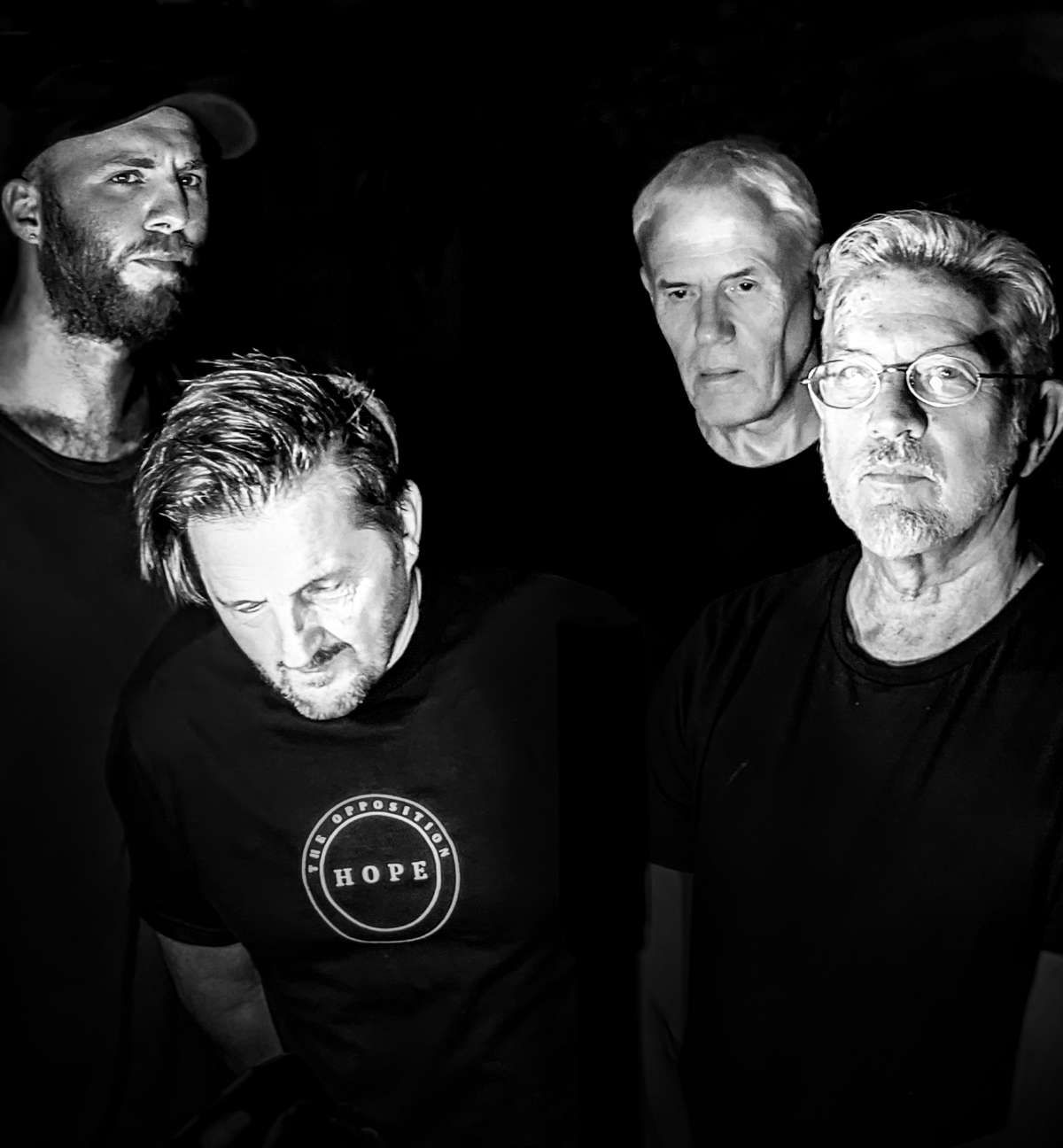
- The Opposition, (2021).

Background information
- Origin: London, England, United Kingdom
- Genres: Post-punk, new wave, coldwave
- Years active: 1979–2022
- Labels: Double Vision, Charisma, Mrs Jones, Right Back, Aztek Musique, PIAS
- Past members: Bernard Husbands; Nico Watts; David Beckett; Kenny Jones; Mark Long (deceased); Marcus Bell (deceased); Ralph Hall; Sterling Campbell; Lol Ford; Terence Devine King; Jean-Daniel Glorioso

The Opposition were a long running post-punk band from London, England. Their early recordings mixed new wave sounds with reggae rhythms. Later as a 'power trio' of Mark Long, Marcus Bell & Ralph Hall they adopted a more edgy, moody, new wave sound that featured lots of atmospheric guitar, echo & deep funky basslines.

Founded in 1979, The Opposition gained lots of interest through gigging in the South of England. This led to them signing for established major record label Ariola Records in early 1980. With the band sounding like a combination of the Police and the Beat an album was recorded and a single released to promote it. This Year/Punishment Of Luxury were taken from the album and became the band's debut single. However it failed to make the impact Ariola were expecting and the band were immediately dropped from the label. The album remained unreleased for 25 years until it was finally released by Right Back Records in 2005.

The band re-grouped and emerged as a trio with a new musical direction. Gone was the 'Two Tone' influence and saxophone, in was a more moody, heavier post-punk sound laced with synth sounds. Later in 1980 they released a track on the independent record label Double Vision Records. The Opposition had one side, Victims Of Circumstance had the other. The Opps track was "Very Little Glory" which the NME (New Musical Express) reviewed and said that it was "a song recorded before its time". Soon after the band went into the studio to record the album Breaking The Silence also on Double Vision Records. This was the first collaboration with producer Kenny Jones whose lush, powerful production would become a trademark of the bands 'power trio' sound on all their albums.

Good reviews of the album led to the band signing to Virgin Records offshoot Charisma Records and released the Intimacy album in 1983. This album evolved the bands sound with influence from both the Chameleons and Joy Division. Two more albums, Promises in 1984 and Empire Days in 1985 followed in the next two years.

The band took a hiatus in 1987, when Bell and Long began working on more commercial-sounding material under the name So. Their album, Horseshoe in the Glove, yielded a minor US hit in the song "Are You Sure", which, despite receiving a moderate amount of airplay on rock radio and being named an MTV "Hip Clip of the Week", barely missed reaching Billboard's Top 40, peaking at number 41. The song also reached number 62 in the UK Singles chart at the beginning of 1988.

The Opposition then regrouped and released the album Blue Alice Blue in 1990, again recorded with Kenny Jones.

Marcus Bell died from cancer in December 2014. Mark Long died from cancer aged 67 in 2022.

== Discography ==
- The Lost Album (1980), Right Back Records (Debut album recorded in 1980 but shelved. Remained unreleased until 2005)
- Breaking the Silence (1981), Double Vision Records
- Intimacy (1983), Double Vision Records
- Promises (1984), Charisma Records
- Empire Days (1985), Charisma Records
- Blue Alice Blue (1990), Declic Records
- '81/'82 (1991), Midnight Music
- War Begins at Home (1994), Universal
- Blinder (2004), Mrs Jones Records
- New York, Paris, Peckham (2004), Right Back Records – live album
- The Class of 66 (2009), Right Back Records
- EP2 (2010), Mrs Jones Records
- Love and Betrayal (2011), Mrs Jones Records
- Somewhere in Between (2018), Aztec Musique
- Live Eighties (2018), Aztec Musique – live album
- Hope (2021), Aztec Musique
