= Basement Screams =

EP by Naked Raygun
- Released: 1983 (original EP); 1999 (reissue)
- Recorded: 1982–1983
- Genre: Post-punk; punk rock
- Length: 12:01; 26:06 (reissue)
- Label: Ruthless Records (original EP); Quarterstick Records (reissue)
- Producer: Tim Powell (original EP); Paul Chabala (Morgan Street sessions)

Naked Raygun chronology
Basement Screams (1983)	Throb Throb (1985)

Professional ratings
Review scores
Source	Rating
AllMusic	2/5 stars

Basement Screams is the debut EP by American punk rock band Naked Raygun, released on Ruthless Records in 1983. Quarterstick Records reissued the EP in 1999, and added the street version of "I Lie" and the 222 S. Morgan St. sessions as bonus material. The 1982 Morgan St. sessions feature the band's original line-up, which would change significantly by the time the band went into the studio to record Basement Screams the following year, and then again with the release of Naked Raygun's first full-length LP.

== Track listing ==
All tracks are written by Santiago Durango, except where noted.

Side One
No.	Title	Writer(s)	Length
1.	"I Lie"		2:03
2.	"Bombshelter"		0:50
3.	"Tojo"	Gonzalez	1:58

Side Two
No.	Title	Writer(s)	Length
4.	"Swingo"		2:19
5.	"Mofo"	Colao/Durango	2:04
6.	"Potential Rapist"	Colao	2:36
Total length:			12:01

1999 CD Reissue Bonus Tracks
No.	Title	Writer(s)	Length
7.	"I Lie" (Street Version)		0:55
8.	"Swingo"		2:33
9.	"12XU"	Gotobed/Lewis/Newman/Gilbert	1:53
10.	"Tell Them"		1:13
11.	"Got Hurt"		2:14
12.	"New Dreams"		1:32
13.	"Fashion"		1:50
14.	"Thank You"		2:14
Total length:			26:06

== Personnel ==
- Jeff Pezzati - vocals, liner notes for reissue
- Santiago Durango - guitar
- Camilo Gonzalez - bass (tracks 1–6)
- Jim Colao - front cover, drums (tracks 1–6)
- Marko Pezzati - bass (tracks 8–14)
- Bobby Strange - drums (tracks 8–14)
- John Haggerty - saxophone (track 4)
- Tim Powell - engineering
- Steve Albini - liner notes for reissue
- Paul Chabala - recording (tracks 8–14)
- Joell Hayes - digital remastering for reissue
