= Articles of Faith (band) =

American hardcore punk band

- Origin: Chicago
- Genres: Hardcore punk, punk rock
- Years active: 1981-1985, 1991-1992, 2010

Articles of Faith was a Chicago-based hardcore punk band originally active between 1981 and 1985. The band's later work is credited with superior songwriting and with foreshadowing the emo sound.

== History ==
Originally a Springsteen/Clash cover band called Direct Drive, the group changed both its music and name after frontman Vic Bondi visited Washington, D.C., in 1981 and saw a Bad Brains show that he describes as an “epiphany.” AoF typically showed funk, reggae and jazz influences, accompanied by lyrics bemoaning the difficulty of finding freedom and fulfillment in consumer society. While the band's influence was blunted by being based in Chicago, it maintained close musical and thematic ties to the Washington DC / Dischord Records scene. Drummer Bill Richman (a.k.a. “Virus X”), a member of the Revolutionary Communist Party briefly left the band in 1984 due to the waning of the band's political emphasis; he returned later to record In This Life. Bondi had already left Chicago by the time AoF disbanded in 1985; In This Life was issued two years later. The original lineup reunited for a European tour in 1991. The final show of this tour was recorded and issued as part of the Your Choice Live series.

Frontman Vic Bondi was originally a protest singer with decidedly leftist views. He went on to form Alloy, and Jones Very after AoF's demise. At the time of AoF's original breakup Bondi was working as a history instructor at the University of Massachusetts Amherst. Bondi's subsequent day jobs included working on Microsoft's Encarta as managing editor of the Encarta Interactive English Learning edition (Bondi's ironic take on his software career can be found here). Bondi resurfaced with another politically charged band, Report Suspicious Activity in 2006, and was featured prominently in the documentaries American Hardcore and You Weren't There.

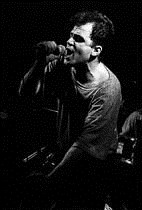
Vic Bondi (with Articles of Faith, 1992)

In 2010, Articles of Faith reunited for an appearance at Riot Fest in Chicago and recorded a new EP.

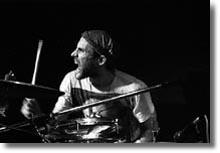
Virus X (1992)

== Legacy ==
Groups who have cited Articles of Faith as a prominent influence include NOFX, Heroin and Disfear.

== Line-up ==
- Vic Bondi (vocals, guitar)
- Dave Shield (bass guitar, vocals)
- Bill Richman a.k.a. Virus X (drums)
- Dorian Tajbakhsh (guitar)
- Joe Scuderi (guitar)

== Discography ==
- What We Want Is Free (EP 1982) - Version Sound, re-released on the band's DIY label, Wasteland Records
- Wait (EP 1983) - Wasteland (3 song ep)
- Give Thanks (LP 1984) - Reflex Records, produced by Bob Mould
- In This Life (LP 1987) - Lone Wolf Records, produced by Bob Mould
- Fortunate Son (EP 2003) - Alternative Tentacles (split with Vic Bondi)
- New Normal Catastrophe (EP 2010) - Alternative Tentacles

=== Anthologies and posthumous collections ===
- Core (CD 1991) – Bitzcore (a collection of EPs, comp appearances, and unreleased tracks recorded from 1981 to 1983)
- Give Thanks (CD 1992) – Bitzcore
- Your Choice Live Series 022 (1994) – Tobby Holzinger / Your Choice Records (last night of 1992 European reunion tour)
- AoF Complete Vol. 1 and AoF Complete Vol. 2 (2002) - Alternative Tentacles, all AoF vinyl recorded 1981–1983 and 1983–1985 respectively

=== Compilation contributions ===
- "Buried Alive" and "False Security" on the Master Tape compilation LP (Affirmation Records, 1982)
- "Five O'Clock" - On The Middle of America compilation LP (H.I.D. Productions, 1984)
- "Up Against The Wall" on the P.E.A.C.E. compilation LP (R Radical Records, 1985)
- "Buy this War" and "American Dreams" on the Fortunate Son split EP (2 old AoF songs along with a solo Vic Bondi performing one original and one cover song) (Alternative Tentacles 2003)
- "Bad Attitude" on the American Hardcore - The History Of American Punk Rock 1980-1986 original documentary soundtrack (Rhino Records, 2006)
- "I Got Mine" on the You Weren't There: A History Of Chicago Punk 1977-1984 documentary soundtrack (Factory 25, 2009)
