= Joe Haggerty =

American drummer

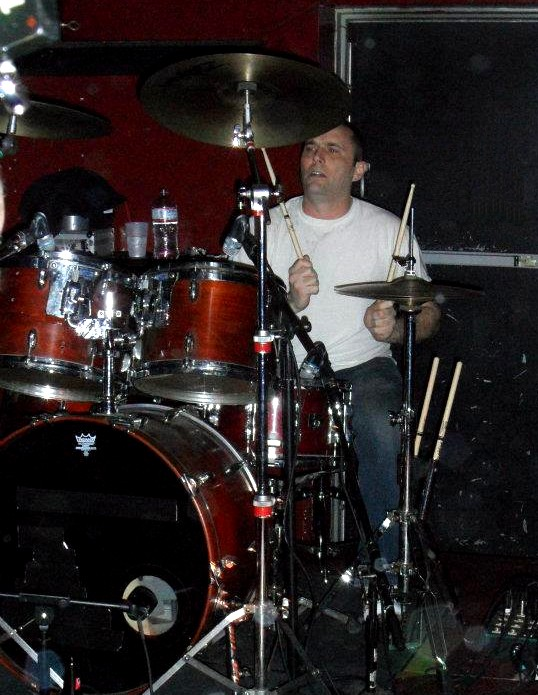

Background information
- Born: Joe Haggerty; July 23, 1966 (age 60)
- Origin: Chicago
- Genres: Punk rock, Pop punk
- Occupation: Musician
- Instrument: Drums
- Years active: 1985–present
- Label: Quarterstick

Joe Haggerty is the drummer for Pegboy and is known for his dense, energetic, relentless and varied drumming style. In the mid-1980s he was the drummer for the Chicago punk band Bloodsport. In 1987, three of the members of Bloodsport, including Haggerty, went on to join a re-formed version of the Effigies. When the Effigies folded in 1990, Haggerty became a founding member of Pegboy, along with his brother John Haggerty.

Haggerty also played in a Chicago band called the Nefarious Fat Cats which featured an all-star line-up including his brother John Haggerty, Jake Burns of Stiff Little Fingers, Herb Rosen of the Beer Nuts and Rights of the Accused, Mark DeRosa of the band Dummy and Scott Lucas of Local H. The band stopped performing when Jake Burns moved from Chicago to West Virginia.

He played with Stiff Little Fingers in December 2012 for a show in Chicago, as a substitute for Steve Grantley who could not make the show.

In 2021 Haggerty became a member of industrial/punk/hard rock supergroup The Joy Thieves by contributing a drum track to their song "Nihilist Landscape" from their album, "American Parasite."

== Partial discography ==
=== Bloodsport ===
- I Am The Game (1985)

=== Pegboy ===
- Strong Reaction (1991)
- Earwig (1994)
- Cha Cha Damore (1997)
