= Jeff Pezzati =

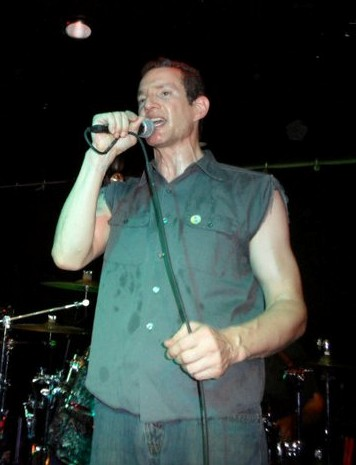

Background information
- Born: February 6, 1960 (age 66)
- Origin: Chicago, Illinois
- Genres: Punk rock; pop punk
- Occupation: Musician
- Instruments: Vocals, bass guitar
- Years active: 1980–present
- Labels: Ruthless, Homestead, Quarterstick, Caroline, No Idea, Thick, Riot Fest, Jettison

Jeffrey Neal Pezzati (born February 6, 1960) is an American musician, known for being the lead singer of the Chicago punk band Naked Raygun. From 1983 to 1985, he also played bass for the band Big Black. In 1980 Pezzati was asked to audition for Naked Raygun (then known as Negro Commando). Pezzati passed the audition and became the band's longest-running member. The band has been credited by Dave Grohl of Nirvana/Foo Fighters fame for inspiring the then 13 year old Grohl to get into punk music.

In 1999 Pezzati founded the band The Bomb.

== Partial discography ==
=== Big Black ===
- Bulldozer (1983)
- Racer-X (EP) (1984)
- The Hammer Party LP (1986)

=== Naked Raygun ===
- Basement Screams EP (1983)
- Throb Throb LP (1985)
- All Rise LP (1986)
- Jettison LP (1988)
- Understand? LP (1989)
- Vanilla Blue / Slim Single (1989)
- Home Single (1990)
- Raygun...Naked Raygun LP (1990)
- Last of the Demohicans DVD (1997)
- Free Shit! live LP/CD (2001)
- What Poor Gods We Do Make CD (2007)
- Iron Maiden / Single (2012)
- Burning Red / Out of Your Mind Single (2013)
- Can't Let Go / Just For Me Single (2014)
- Over the Overlords LP (2021)

=== The Bomb ===
- Arming EP (1999)
- Torch Songs LP (2000)
- Indecision LP (2005)
- Speed Is Everything LP (2009)
- The Challenger LP (2011)
- Axis of Awesome EP (2014)
