= John Haggerty =

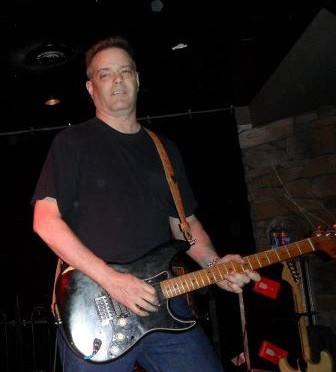

Background information
- Born: John Haggerty; October 17, 1960 (age 65)
- Origin: Chicago
- Genres: Punk rock, Pop punk
- Occupation: Musician
- Instrument: Guitar
- Years active: 1983–present
- Labels: Quarterstick, Caroline

John Haggerty (born October 17, 1960, Chicago) is an American punk rock guitarist. Haggerty was a member of Naked Raygun from 1983 to 1989. Upon leaving Naked Raygun, He formed the band Pegboy with brother Joe Haggerty, Steve Saylors, and Larry Damore.

== Background ==
The eldest son of a plumber father and a librarian mother, Haggerty first picked up the guitar at age 16. His early influences included Jimmy Page, Ritchie Blackmore, Michael Schenker and Brian Robertson. Upon discovering the Chicago punk scene at O'Banions, Haggerty quickly began searching for his place in punk rock. His biggest influences were the Buzzcocks, the Ramones, Stiff Little Fingers and the Jam.

John also plays in a band called the Nefarious Fat Cats which features an all star line up including himself and brother Joe, Jake Burns of Stiff Little Fingers, Herb Rosen of Beer Nuts and Rights of the Accused, Mark DeRosa of the band Dummy and Scott Lucas of Local H.

John toured with Stiff Little Fingers in mid-2011 as a substitute for Ian McCallum, who could not make the tour due to illness.

In 2021 Haggerty became a member of industrial/punk/hard rock supergroup The Joy Thieves by contributing a guitar track to their song "Nihilist Landscape" from their album, "American Parasite."

== Partial discography ==
=== Naked Raygun ===
- Throb Throb (1983)
- All Rise (1986)
- Jettison (1988)
- Understand? (1989)
- Last Of The Demo Hicans (1997)

=== Pegboy ===
- Strong Reaction (1991)
- Earwig (1994)
- Cha Cha Damore (1997)

=== Singles and EPs ===
- 1990 - Three-Chord Monte EP (Quarterstick)
- 1991 - "Field of Darkness"/"Walk on By" 7" (Quarterstick)
- 1993 - Fore EP (Quarterstick)
- 1996 - Dangermare (Split with Kepone) 7" (Quarterstick)
