= Naked Raygun =

American punk band

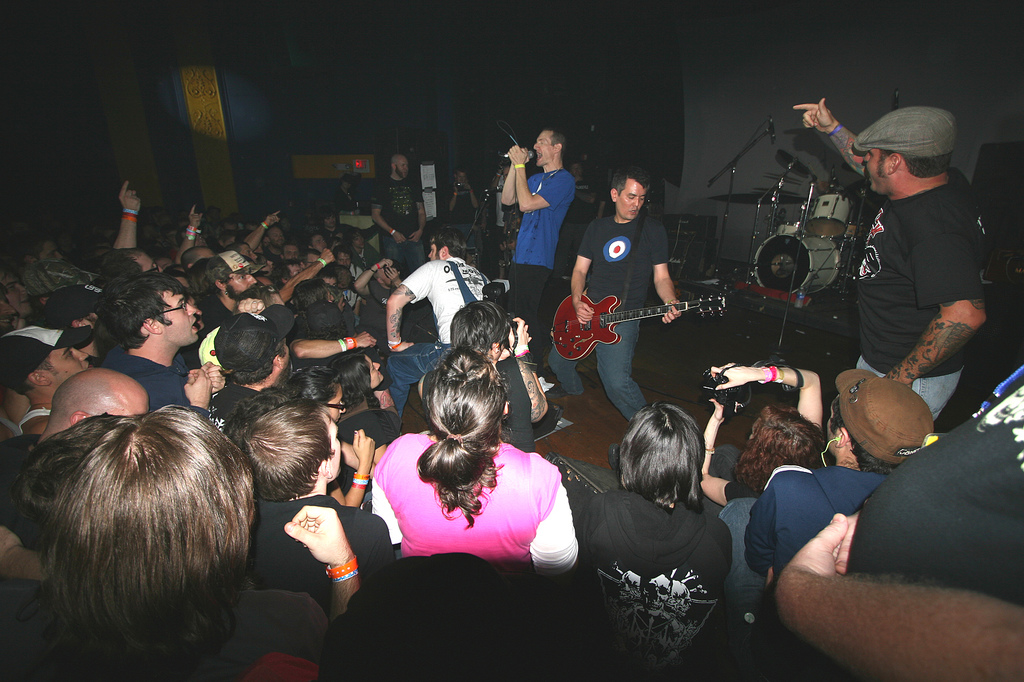
- Naked Raygun performing in Gainesville, Florida, 2007

Background information
- Origin: Chicago, Illinois
- Genres: Punk rock; post-hardcore; post-punk
- Years active: 1980–1992; 2006–present
- Labels: Ruthless; Homestead; Quarterstick; Enigma; Caroline; Riot Fest Records; Wax Trax!
- Members: Jeff Pezzati; Bill Stephens; Eric Spicer; Fritz Doreza
- Past members: Santiago Durango; John Haggerty; Pierre Kezdy; Bobby Strange; Jim Colao; Marko Pezzati; Camilo Gonzalez; John Lundin; Sensitive Pete
- Website: www.nakedraygun.org

Naked Raygun is an American punk rock band that formed in Chicago in 1980. The band was active from 1980 to 1992, along with reunion shows in 1997, and since 2006.

Naked Raygun have cited various bands as influences, including Buzzcocks, Wire, the Stranglers, the Damned, the Ruts, Killing Joke, Siouxsie and the Banshees, the Jam, and the Clash.

== History ==
=== Initial run ===
The band was formed in 1980 by Santiago Durango, Marko Pezzati and later Jeff Pezzati. Singer Jeff Pezzati was the sole constant member through multiple personnel changes. Members over time include drummers Bobby Strange, Jim Colao, and Eric Spicer; bassists Marko Pezzati, Pierre Kezdy, Camilo Gonzalez, Pete Mittler and Fritz Doreza; guitarists Santiago Durango, John Haggerty, and Bill Stephens; and keyboardist John Lundin.

Durango and Jeff Pezzati were also members of Big Black.

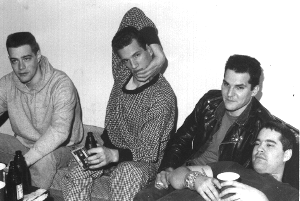
Naked Raygun in 1987. L-R: John Haggerty, Jeff Pezzati, Eric Spicer, Pierre Kezdy

=== Post-Naked Raygun ===
In 1989, John Haggerty left Naked Raygun to form Pegboy with his younger brother Joe (formerly of Bloodsport and The Effigies) and Steve Saylors and Larry Damore of the Bhopal Stiffs (Pierre Kezdy would later replace Steve Saylors).

Jeff Pezzati is also the lead singer of The Bomb.

=== Reunions ===
A two-show reunion in 1997 produced the live album Free Shit!.

In 1999, the independent record label Quarterstick Records re-issued the band's back catalog on CD.

In 2006 Naked Raygun reunited for Riot Fest, an annual punk rock festival held in Chicago. Following their 2006 reunion, Naked Raygun announced that the band was "back for good." The reunited lineup consists of its "Raygun...Naked Raygun" members: Pezzati, Stephens, Kezdy, and Spicer. In 2009 Naked Raygun returned to the studio for the first time since 1997 for a series of 7-inch singles released on Riot Fest Records and announced plans to record an LP, the first since 1990's Raygun... Naked Raygun.

In 2011, Pete Mittler of The Methadones joined the line-up so that longtime bassist Pierre Kezdy could recover from a stroke.

In August 2014, Naked Raygun opened for Bad Religion, The Offspring and Stiff Little Fingers on the last two shows of the Summer Nationals tour at The Rave in Milwaukee and Harrah's Stir Cove in Council Bluffs, Iowa.

Naked Raygun (along with Urge Overkill and Cheap Trick) opened for the Foo Fighters at Wrigley Field, Chicago, on August 29, 2015.

Although the band announced plans to release a new album in 2016, no recordings were released until 2021's Over The Overlords.

Pierre Kezdy died of cancer on October 9, 2020.

== Musical style ==
Mark Deming of AllMusic described Naked Raygun's sound as "a powerful mix of anthemic melodies, slashing and grinding guitars, shout-along choruses, percolating rhythms, and lyrics that focused on the overlap between the personal and the political." He further characterized the sound as "bridging the gap between hardcore and melodic punk."

== Legacy and influence ==
Naked Raygun have been cited as an influence by Blink-182, Rise Against, Fall Out Boy and Dave Grohl of Nirvana and Foo Fighters. Grohl's first concert was a Naked Raygun performance in Chicago. He recalled: "I'd never seen a band before, and my cousin took me to see a punk-rock band, and it totally changed my life. So I would be in lockdown with one of my favourite punk-rock bands of all time, and I would probably be in heaven."

Blink-182’s Matt Skiba references Naked Raygun in the song “Parking Lot” from their California album.

== Members ==
=== Current members ===
- Jeff Pezzati – vocals (1980–1992, 2006–present)
- Bill Stephens – guitar (1989–1992, 2006–present)
- Eric Spicer – drums (1984–1992, 2006–present)
- Fritz Doreza – bass (2013–present)

=== Former members ===
- Santiago Durango – guitar (1980–1983)
- Marko Pezzati – bass (1980–1981)
- Bobby Strange – drums (1980)
- Jim Colao – drums (1980–1984)
- John Lundin – keyboards (1980–1981)
- Camilo Gonzalez – bass (1981–1985)
- John Haggerty – guitar (1983–1989)
- Sensitive Pete Mittler – bass (2011–2013)
- Pierre Kezdy – bass (1985–1992, 2006–2010; died 2020)

== Discography ==
=== Albums ===
- Throb Throb LP (Homestead Records) (1985)/(Quarterstick) (1999–CD only)/(Haunted Town) (2008–LP only)
- All Rise LP (Homestead) (1986)/(Quarterstick) (1999–CD only)/(Haunted Town) (2008–LP only)
- Jettison LP Caroline (1988)/(Quarterstick) (1999 – CD only)
- Understand? LP (Caroline) (1989)/(Quarterstick) (1999–CD only)
- Raygun...Naked Raygun LP (Caroline) (1990)/Quarterstick (1999–CD only)
- Last of the Demohicans CD (Dyslexic) (1997)
- Free Shit LP/CD (Haunted Town) (2001) - live
- Over the Overlords LP (Wax Trax!) (2021)

=== EPs ===
- Basement Screams 12-inch (Ruthless (1983)/(Quarterstick) (1999 – CD only)/(Haunted Town) (2007 – LP only)
- Treason 12-inch (Caroline) (1989) - on pink vinyl limited to 2,500 numbered records (although unnumbered versions, stamped "Promo only" exist)

=== Singles ===
- Flammable Solid 7-inch (Ruthless) (1983) - "Surf Combat", "Gear"/"Libido"
- Vanilla Blue 7-inch (Sandpounder) (1987) - "Vanilla Blue"/"Slim (The Second Coming Of Christ) [on white/light blue marbled vinyl]
- Home 7-inch (Caroline) (1990) - "Home"/"Last Drink" [on green vinyl]
- Series 1 7-inch (Riot Fest) (2009) - "Mein Iron Maiden"/"Out Of Your Mind" [on red & on cream vinyl]
- Series 2 7-inch (Riot Fest) (2010) - "Growing Away"/"Just For Me" [on violet & on black vinyl]
- Series 3 7-inch (Riot Fest) (2011) - "Burning Red"/"Black Eyed Blue" [on clear orange vinyl]

=== Compilations ===
- Huge Bigness-Selected Tracks From Collected Works 1980-1992 (Quarterstick) (1999)
- What Poor Gods We Do Make: The Story And Music Behind Naked Raygun (Riot Fest) (2007) [included with DVD of same name]
- Totally...Naked Raygun 5XCD (Audio Platter) (2021)

=== Compilation appearances ===
- Busted At Oz (Autum/Permanent) (1981/2011) - "Bomb Shelter", "When The Screaming Stops", "Paranoia", "Libido"
- Bang Zoom Issue #4 cassette (Bang Zoom) (1984) - "Swingo"
- Code Blue cassette (Last Rites) (1984) - "No Sex", "Only In America"
- The Middle Of America Compilation (H.I.D. Productions) (1984) - "I Don't Know", "Stupid"
- Flipside Vinyl Fanzine #2 (Flipside) (1985) - "Metastasis"
- Gunfire & Pianos (Situation Two/ZigZag Magazine) (1986) - "Metastasis"
- Paranoia You Can Dance To (Weird System) (1986) - "Metastasis"
- Sub Pop 100 (Sub Pop) (1986) - "Bananacuda"
- Rat Music For Rat People Vol. III (CD Presents) (1987) - "Rocks Of Sweden"
- Rat Music For Rat People Vol. I, II & III (CD Presents) (1987) - "Rocks Of Sweden"
- Untitled 7-inch EP (Discopêö) (1987) - "Peacemaker (live)"
- The Wailing Ultimate-The Homestead Records Compilation ([Homestead Records|Homestead]) (1987) - "I Remember"
- Sounds And Shigaku Limited Present: Beautiful Happiness (Sounds And Shigaku Limited) (1988) - "Vanilla Blue"
- Live Treatment cassette (Shotgunning Tape SXXXXX Inc./Discraceland) (1989) - "Never Follow"
- Somethings's Gone Wrong Again: The Buzzcocks Covers Compilation (C/Z) (1992) - "Love Battery"
- The Best Of Flipside Vinyl Fanzine 2XCD (Flipside) (1993) - "Metastasis"
- Faster & Louder-Hardcore Punk, Vol. 2 (Rhino) (1993) - "Metastasis"
- Nightmare/Bad Taste-News Vol. 10 cassette (Bad Taste) (1998) - "Rat Patrol"
- Rats In The Hallway #14 (Rats In The Hallway) (2000) - "Treason"
- Haunted Town Records CD Sampler #1 CDr (Haunted Town) (2008) - "I Lie", "Backlash Jack"
- You Weren't There movie soundtrack (Factory 25) (2009) - "Tojo (demo)"
- ... On The Rawks Compilation (ProRawk) (2020) - "Broken Things"

=== Video ===
- "Broken Things"
- "Home"
- "Living in The Good Times"
- "Vanilla Blue"
- "What Poor Gods We Do Make" DVD (Riot Fest) (2007) [included with CD of same name]

== See also ==
- You Weren't There: A History of Chicago Punk 1977-1984 (dir. Joe Losurdo and Christina Tillman) (2007) - Documentary
