= Iain Burgess =

British record producer (1953–2010)

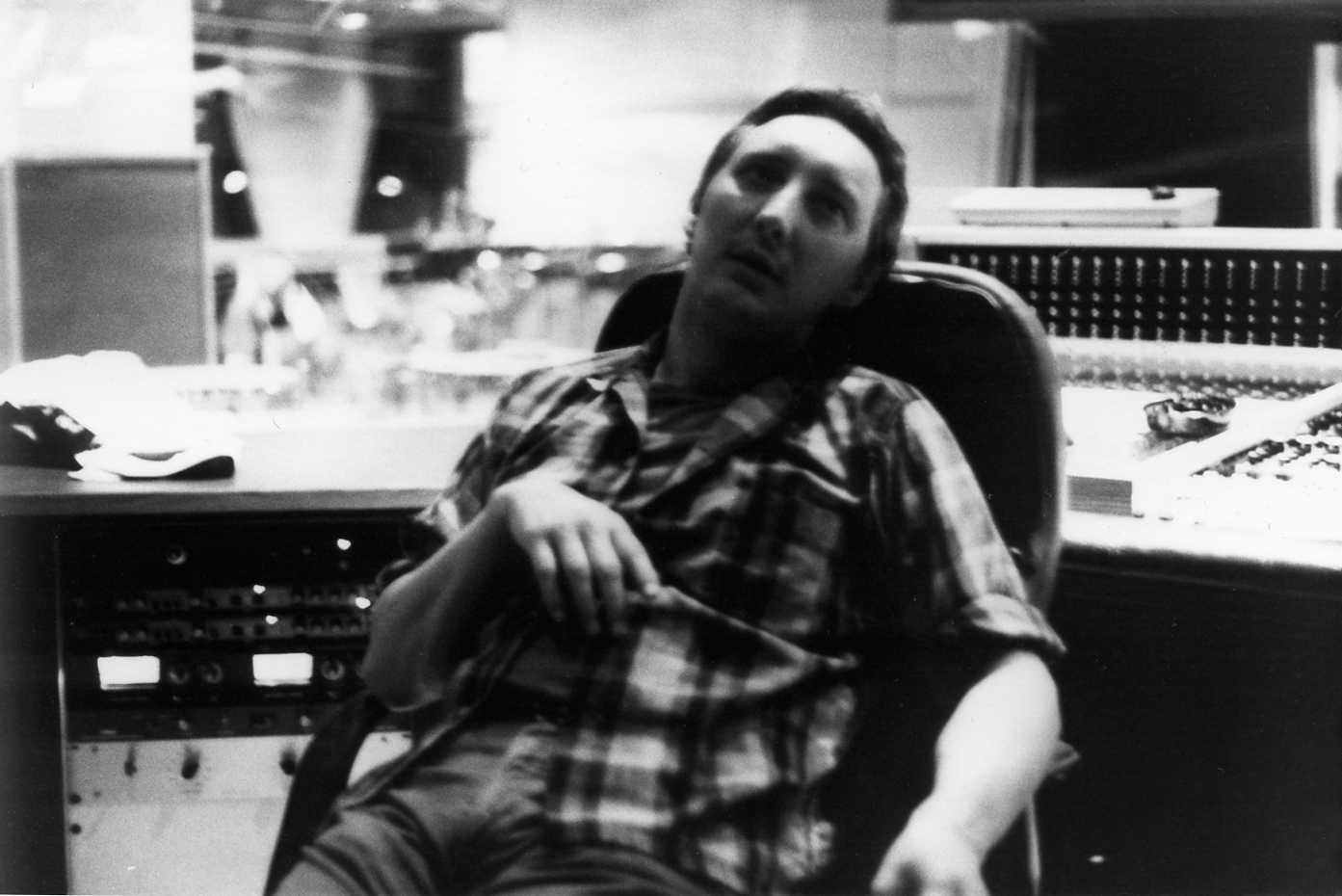
- Burgess in 1985

Background information
- Born: 24 November 1953; Weymouth, Dorset, England
- Died: 11 February 2010 (aged 56) France
- Genres: Alternative rock
- Occupations: Record producer, audio engineer
- Years active: 1980–2010

Iain Burgess (24 November 1953 – 11 February 2010) was an English record producer and audio engineer. He helped define the sound of the Chicago post-punk music scene in the 1980s and early 1990s. Burgess worked with a number of key underground bands including Big Black, Naked Raygun, the Effigies, Rifle Sport, Toothpaste, Get Smart!, Ministry, Green, Bloodsport, Pegboy, Poster Children, and Bhopal Stiffs.

Burgess was a native of Weymouth, Dorset, England.

His "Chicago sound" was described by the Chicago Tribune as "built on no-nonsense elements: powerhouse drumming, prominent bass lines, and bold guitars that split the difference between anthemic and anarchic." The Chicago Sun-Times described it as "a massive, crunching, live-and-in-your-face sound". It was a sound that influenced Burgess' friend and student Steve Albini.

Burgess also worked with the Defoliants, Heavy Manners, the Cows, the Didjits, Breaking Circus, Jawbox, Heliogabale, Daria, Les Vilains Clowns, Papier Tigre, Mega City Four, and many others.

Burgess moved to Europe in the early 1990s and worked at Black Box (his own recording studio in rural France, Black Box Recording Studio - La Dionnaie - 49520 Noyant la Gravoyere - France.)

Burgess died in France on 11 February 2010 of a pulmonary embolism, a complication of pancreatic and liver cancer.
