= Shellac discography =

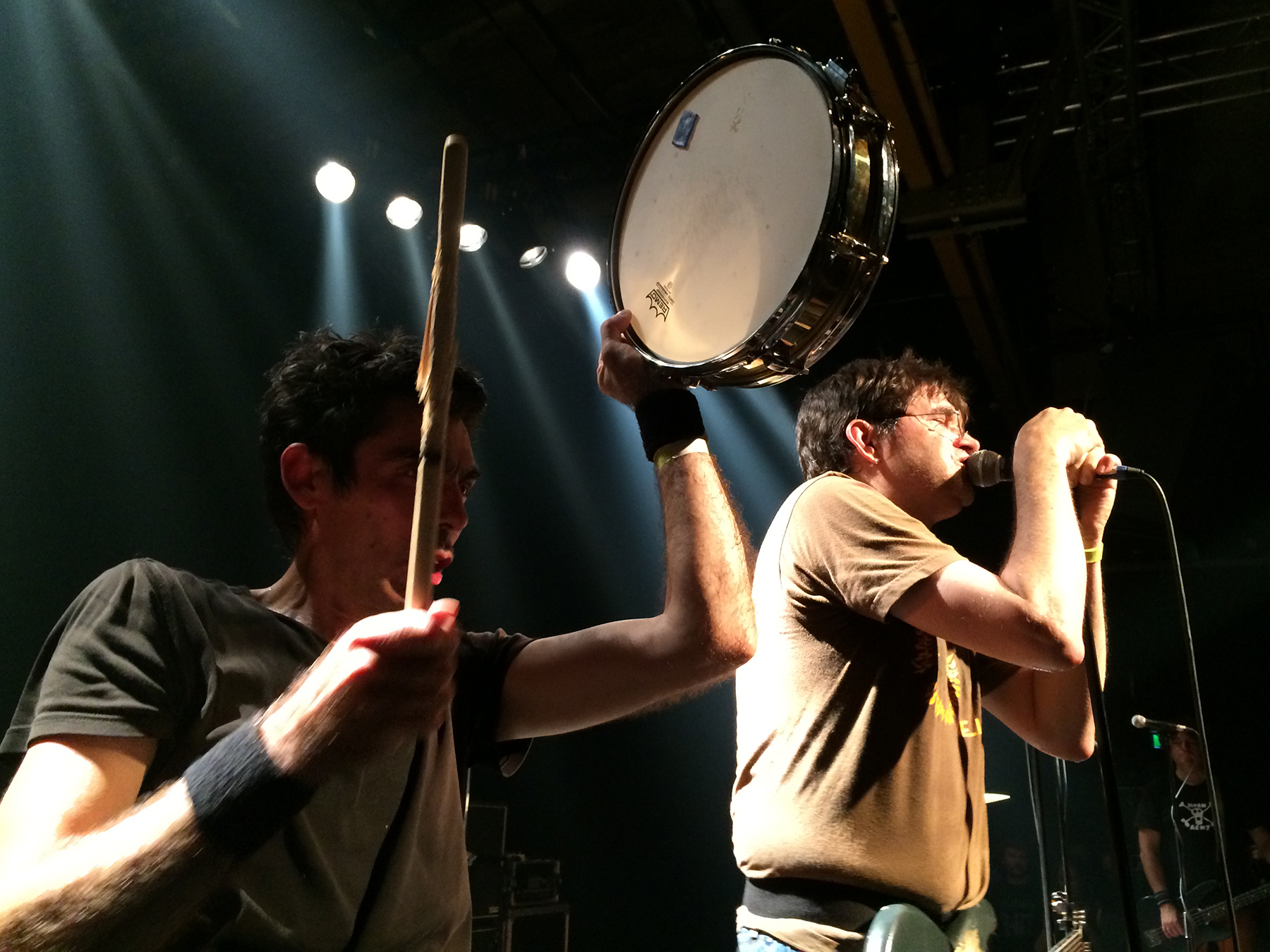
- Shellac performing live in Hamburg, 2014
- Studio albums: 6
- Extended plays: 3
- Live albums: 2
- Compilation albums: 1
- Singles: 1

The discography of Shellac, an American noise rock band, includes six studio albums. Shellac numbers almost all of their releases.

== Albums ==
=== Studio albums ===
Title	Album details	Peak chart positions	
Title	Album details	UK	US
At Action Park	Released: October 24, 1994; Label: Touch and Go	—	—
Terraform	Released: February 10, 1998; Label: Touch and Go	—	—
1000 Hurts	Released: August 8, 2000; Label: Touch and Go	—	—
Excellent Italian Greyhound	Released: June 5, 2007; Label: Touch and Go	—	—
Dude Incredible	Released: September 16, 2014; Label: Touch and Go	82	89
To All Trains	Released: May 17, 2024; Label: Touch and Go	—	—
"—" denotes a recording that did not chart or was not released in that territory.

=== Live albums ===
Title	Album details
Live in Tokyo	Released: December 1994; Recorded: November 21, 1993; Label: NUX Organization

=== Compilation albums ===
Title	Album details
The End of Radio	Released: June 14, 2019; Label: Touch and Go

=== Other albums ===
Title	Album details
The Futurist	Released: Late 1997; Label: Self-released

== Extended plays ==
Title	EP details
The Rude Gesture: A Pictorial History	Released: October 10, 1993; Label: Touch and Go
Uranus	Released: October 1993; Label: Touch and Go
The Bird Is the Most Popular Finger	Released: August 22, 1994; Label: Drag City

== Singles ==
- "Billiardspielerlied" b/w "Mantel" (1995, Überschall Records)

=== Splits ===
Year	Album details
1995	Sides 1–4 split double 7-inch: Released: 1995; Label: Skin Graft Records, Gasoline Boost Records; Release No. #7; Split with: Big'n, Brise-Glace, U.S. Maple; "'95 Jailbreak"
1997	The Soul Sound Single split 7-inch: Released: February 11, 1997; Label: Touch and Go; Release No. #8; Split with: Mule; "The Rambler Song"
2000	Split 7-inch with Caesar: Released: August 25, 2000; Label: Barbaraal; Release No. #12; Split with: Caesar; "Augustino"

== Compilation appearances ==
- "Copper Song" on the Ground Rule Double compilation 2×LP/CD (1995, Actionboy / Divot Records)
- "Killers" on the Lounge Ax Defense & Relocation Compact Disk compilation CD (1996, Touch and Go Records)
- "Watch Song" on the Shellac Curated All Tomorrow's Parties 2.0 compilation CD (2002, ATPR)
- "Steady As She Goes (live)" on Burn To Shine Volume 2: Chicago IL 09.13.2004 compilation DVD (2005, Trixie DVD)
- "The End of Radio" on A.P. Bio Season 1 Episode 13 "Drenching Dallas" television series (2018, NBC)
