= Steve Miller (nonfiction author) =

American journalist

- Born: Steven Robert Miller; Buffalo, New York, U.S.
- Occupations: Author, journalist, musician
- Style: True crime, music

Steven Robert Miller is an American musician, journalist and author. His 2013 book Detroit Rock City: The Uncensored History of Rock 'n' Roll in America's Loudest City reached No. 5 on Amazon in the rock and roll bestsellers category. His most recent releases include Murder in Grosse Pointe Park: Privilege, Adultery, and the Killing of Jane Bashara (2015, Penguin/Berkley), a true crime title exploring the death of Jane Bashara, and Juggalo: Insane Clown Posse, Their Fans, and the World They Made (2016, Da Capo Press), a detailed look at Insane Clown Posse and their dedicated fanbase.

He has written and edited books on crime and music, including Girl, Wanted: The Chase for Sarah Pender; Nobody's Women: The Crimes and Victims of Anthony Sowell, the Cleveland Serial Killer; Commando: The Autobiography of Johnny Ramone; and Touch and Go: The Complete Hardcore Punk Zine '79–'83.

Detroit Rock City, a book stocked with verbatim quotes from Detroit rock legends, was published in June 2013. The book received positive reviews from the Wall Street Journal, among other national and international publications.

== Early life ==
Miller was born in Buffalo, the only child of Boyd and Julie Miller, a newspaper man and a high school teacher. The family eventually settled in Lansing, Michigan, where his father became a journalism professor at Michigan State University.

== Music ==
Miller was the vocalist in the hardcore punk band the Fix, which he co-founded in Lansing in March 1980 with bassist Mike Achtenberg. The Fix were the first band signed to Touch and Go Records. Miller intended to be the guitarist in the band when he and Achtenberg began assembling personnel, but when guitarist Craig Calvert answered their ad posted in a laundromat, he proved so talented that Miller agreed to sing instead.

The Fix released two 7-inch records, the single "Vengeance" b/w "In This Town" (March 1981) and the four-song EP Jan's Rooms (January 1982), both on Touch and Go. They also contributed the song "No Idols" to the 1981 Touch and Go compilation EP Process of Elimination. The first Fix single is among the most collectible hardcore records in the world, at one point fetching $4,250 on eBay.

The band was among the first hardcore bands to tour the U.S., obtaining a contact list from Chuck Dukowski of Black Flag and D.O.A. manager Ken Lester. During the band's first tour in summer 1981, the Fix shared bills with Dead Kennedys, Flipper, D.O.A. and T.S.O.L. A second tour later that year included a show with Toxic Reasons. On New Year's Eve 1981, the Fix played a warehouse concert with Flipper, Dead Kennedys, the Effigies and Anti-Pasti. It was the Fix's final show.

In early 1982, Miller and Achtenberg formed Blight, which also featured Tesco Vee of the Meatmen as vocalist. During the band's four-month existence, they performed a dozen shows in the Detroit area, and recorded an eponymous EP in the basement studio of Corey Rusk, which was released posthumously in 1983.

In 1983, Miller played guitar in Strange Fruit, which also featured Steve Shelley of Sonic Youth on drums. They issued one three-song 7-inch single with Miller, "On Top of a Hill" (1983, Babel Records).

== Bibliography ==
- A Slaying in the Suburbs: The Tara Grant Murder (2009, Penguin/Berkley)
- Touch and Go: The Complete Hardcore Punk Zine '79–'83 (2010, Bazillion Points)
- Girl, Wanted: The Chase for Sarah Pender (2011, Penguin/Berkley)
- Commando: The Autobiography of Johnny Ramone (2012, Abrams Books)
- Nobody's Women: The Crimes and Victims of Anthony Sowell, the Cleveland Serial Killer (2012, Penguin/Berkley)
- Detroit Rock City: The Uncensored History of Rock 'n' Roll in America's Loudest City (2013, Da Capo Press)
- Murder in Grosse Pointe Park: Privilege, Adultery, and the Killing of Jane Bashara (2015, Penguin/Berkley)
- Juggalo: Insane Clown Posse, Their Fans, and the World They Made (2016, Da Capo Press)
- The Laughing Hyenas (2025, J-Card Press)

== Discography ==
The Fix

- "Vengeance" 7-inch single (1981, Touch and Go Records)
- Jan's Rooms 7-inch EP (1982, Touch and Go Records)
- Cold Days compilation album (1990, Lost and Found Records)
- At the Speed of Twisted Thought... compilation album (2006, Touch and Go Records)

Blight

- Blight 7-inch EP (1983, Touch and Go Records)
- Detroit : The Dream Is Dead - The Collected Works of a Midwest Hardcore Noise Band 1982 compilation album (2006, Touch and Go Records)

Strange Fruit

- "On Top of a Hill" 7-inch single (1983, Babel Records)
