= Dude Incredible =

2014 album by Shellac

Studio album by Shellac
- Released: September 16, 2014
- Genres: Noise rock; math rock; post-hardcore
- Length: 32:43
- Label: Touch and Go
- Producer: Shellac

Shellac chronology
Excellent Italian Greyhound (2007)	Dude Incredible (2014)	The End of Radio (2019)

Dude Incredible is the sixth studio album by the American rock band Shellac, released on September 16, 2014, on Touch and Go Records. It is the final studio album to be released during Steve Albini's lifetime.

== Packaging ==
Physical copies of Dude Incredible are packaged in a chipboard album jacket. The packaging features two "high gloss, full color monkeys" as the front cover artwork. The front cover was photographed by Reuters photographer Anton Meres; additional photographic images were provided by David Manthey.

== Release ==
Dude Incredible was announced for release on Touch and Go Records' official website in July 2014. In the announcement, it was revealed that vinyl editions of the album were mastered "entirely in the analog domain" using a process known as direct metal mastering. The vinyl discs were manufactured at Record Technology, Inc. in Camarillo, California using the pressing plant's HQ-180 system.

The album was released on September 16, 2014 on 180-gram LP, CD and as a digital download in various formats, including AAC, MP3 and "full-bandwidth 24-bit" AIFF files, which were made available on HDtracks. A digital booklet was included on the iTunes Store edition of the album, and a CD copy of Dude Incredible was packaged with all LP editions. Upon its release in the United Kingdom, Dude Incredible placed in the top 10 of the Independent Breakers Album Chart.

== Reception ==
Professional ratings
Aggregate scores
Source	Rating
AnyDecentMusic?	8.1/10
Metacritic	84/100
Review scores
Source	Rating
AllMusic	3.5/5 stars
Clash	9/10
Consequence of Sound	A−
Exclaim!	9/10
Financial Times	4/5 stars
The Line of Best Fit	10/10 stars
Louder Sound	4.5/5 stars
Louder Than War	10/10
Pitchfork	8.0/10
Tiny Mix Tapes	4/5 marks

Dude Incredible received positive reviews from music critics. At Metacritic, which assigns a normalized rating out of 100 to reviews from mainstream critics, the album received an average score of 84, based on 13 reviews, indicating "universal acclaim". AllMusic reviewer Mark Deming offered a largely mixed review of Dude Incredible, saying "it doesn't sound lazy, just short one or two top-rank songs that would bump its status up a notch, but it's clearly the work of as strong and interesting a band as you can hear these days." He rated the album three-and-a-half out of five stars. Writing for Consequence of Sound, Adam Kivel said that the album "never sounds labored over—it just sounds intensely practiced. The interlocking rhythms and riffs work like cogs in a meticulously handcrafted clock" and selected "All the Surveyors", "Riding Bikes", and "Compliant" as "essential tracks", ultimately awarding the record an A− rating.

The Line of Best Fit's Andrew Hannah rated Dude Incredible a full ten-star rating and concluded in his review: "It's going to be hard for Albini, Weston and Trainer to ever top what we find on Dude Incredible. Worthy of filing alongside and above At Action Park and 1000 Hurts, it's the sound of one of the great bands at the height of their powers." Pitchfork writer Nick Neyland published a favorable review of the album and said that considering the gap between its release and Excellent Italian Greyhound (2007) that "Dude Incredible sounds surprisingly vital … Prior records often contained a track or two that were lost somewhere between inspiration, endurance tests, and technical feats but there's none of that [on Dude Incredible]. Instead, Shellac go straight for your throat and don't loosen their grip until the bitter end." Ludovic Hunter-Tilney of the Financial Times awarded the album a four out of five star rating. John Robb of The Membranes reviewed the album for Louder Than War. He gave the album 10/10 and called it "a relentlessly brilliant work of no compromise and musician perfection that doesn’t fit in anywhere and spits on your boring rock narrative.

Tiny Mix Tapes' Simon Chandler was initially critical of the album, saying that while it maintained "the band's adherence to Spartan instrumentation, minimalist structures, and a brutally dry approach … it doesn’t throw up too many surprises." Chandler later wrote positively about the consistency of the album and noted that it "doesn't suffer from any missteps or indulgences" of Shellac's prior releases, such as Terraform (1998). He ultimately rated the album four out of five stars.

Steve Albini went over each song track by track for Exclaim! magazine.

=== Accolades ===
Publication	Country	Accolade	Rank
Consequence of Sound	US	Top 50 Albums of 2014	21
Clash	UK	Clash's Fuss-Free Top 40 Albums of 2014	30
Pitchfork	US	The 50 Best Albums of 2014	47
The Quietus	UK	Quietus Albums of the Year 2014	60
Crack Magazine	UK	Albums of the Year 2014	74
The Line of Best Fit	UK	The Best Fit Fifty Essential Albums of 2014	-
musicOMH	UK	musicOMH’s Top 100 Albums of 2014	85
The Village Voice	US	The 2014 Pazz & Jop Critic's Poll	99
Sound Opinions (Jim DeRogatis)	US	Jim's Top Albums	5
The Guardian	UK	Hidden gems 2014: the albums that got away	-

== Track listing ==
All songs written by Shellac except where noted.

Side one
No.	Title	Length
1.	"Dude Incredible"	6:00
2.	"Compliant"	3:38
3.	"You Came in Me"	2:06
4.	"Riding Bikes"	5:28

Side two
No.	Title	Length
5.	"All the Surveyors"	3:20
6.	"The People's Microphone"	3:12
7.	"Gary (T-Bone Slim)"	4:00
8.	"Mayor/Surveyor"	1:41
9.	"Surveyor"	3:12
Total length:		32:43

== Personnel ==
All personnel credits adapted from Dude Incredible's album notes.

Shellac

- Steve Albini – guitar, vocals
- Todd Trainer – drums, vocals
- Bob Weston – bass, vocals

Technical personnel

- Grégoire Yeche – engineering
- Jon San Paolo – engineering
- Matthew Russell – assistance
- Steve Rooke – mastering

Design personnel

- David Babbitt – layout
- Anton Meres – photography
- David Manthey – photography

== Chart positions ==
Chart (2014)	Peak position
Belgian Albums Chart (Flanders)	99
UK Albums (Official Charts)	82
UK Independent Albums Chart	36
UK Independent Breakers Album Chart	5
US Billboard 200	85
US Independent Albums (Billboard)	20
US Top Alternative Albums (Billboard)	17
US Top Rock Albums (Billboard)	30
