= The End of Radio =

2019 album by Shellac

Compilation album by Shellac
- Released: June 14, 2019
- Recorded: July 14, 1994; December 1, 2004
- Studio: Maida Vale Studios (London)
- Genre: Post-hardcore; noise rock; math rock; experimental rock
- Length: 62:02
- Label: Touch and Go
- Producer: James Birtwistle (1994); Guy Worth (2004)

Shellac chronology
Dude Incredible (2014)	The End of Radio (2019)	To All Trains (2024)

The End of Radio is a 2019 album by Shellac. The album contains two previously unreleased recordings made for the BBC Radio One's John Peel Show in 1994 and 2004. Steve Albini has spoken about his admiration for John Peel, stating that "he listened religiously to every single record he received in the mail, devoting hours of every day to the task".

== Recordings ==
=== 1994 Peel session ===
The 1994 session was recorded in July 1994 in the BBC Maida Vale Studio to 24 track tape and then mixed to stereo. The tracks are:

1. "Spoke"
2. "Canada"
3. "Crow"
4. "Disgrace"

All of the tracks were unavailable on other recordings at the time. A studio version of "Crow" was released later the same year on the album At Action Park, but the other three songs would not appear in studio versions until subsequent albums were released many years later.

=== 2004 Peel session ===
The eight tracks on the 2004 session were recorded live in front of a studio audience at BBC Maida Vale and broadcast simultaneously. The session was undertaken a few weeks after John Peel had died and the performance was dedicated to his memory. The songs are:

1. "Ghosts"
2. "The End of Radio"
3. "Canada"
4. "Paco"
5. "Steady As She Goes"
6. "Billiard Player Song"
7. "Dog and Pony Show"
8. "Il Porno Star"

As with the 1994 session, the 2004 recordings included some songs that were unavailable on official releases at the time. "The End of Radio", "Steady As She Goes" and "Paco" were later recorded for the album Excellent Italian Greyhound (2007).

== Critical reception ==
Professional ratings
Aggregate scores
Source	Rating
Metacritic	83/100
Review scores
Source	Rating
Allmusic	4/5 stars
Exclaim!	9/10
OndaRock	7/10
Pitchfork	7.6/10
Spectrum Culture	3.75/5

Based on 4 reviews, the album received a Metacritic score of 83/100, indicating "[u]niversal acclaim". Pitchfork wrote that The End of Radio "captures, in great fidelity, the acerbic personality and power of Steve Albini's trio". Spectrum Culture gave the album 3.75/5 and described it as "an invaluable document of a band unwilling to be tamed, not even by itself". Allmusic stated that "the clarity of the remastering on The End of Radio makes this a must for fans of Shellac. It would be nice if we could get another live set from this trio that was recorded less than 15 years ago, yet as an artifact of the Live Shellac Experience and a sincere tribute to fallen comrades, this is as good as you could hope for".

The Attic picked the album as one of their favorites of the year, while The Quietus ranked it at #31 on the list of their "100 favourite reissues, soundtracks, mixes[,] live albums, compilations and miscellany" of 2019.

== Track listing ==
1. "Spoke" – 2:03
2. "Canada" – 2:28
3. "Crow" – 4:46
4. "Disgrace" – 3:39
5. "Ghosts" – 4:23
6. "The End of Radio" – 9:21
7. "Canada" – 2:50
8. "Paco" – 6:13
9. "Steady as She Goes" – 5:06
10. "Billiard Player Song" – 9:10
11. "Dog and Pony Show" – 4:27
12. "Il Porno Star" – 7:36

== Credits ==
Adapted from liner notes:

- Steve Albini – guitar, vocals
- Bob Weston – bass, vocals, mastering, photography
- Todd Trainer – drums
- Corey Rusk – executive producer
- David Babbitt – design
- Jamie Beeden – photography
- Ed Waring – photography
