= Uranus (EP) =

1993 EP by Shellac

EP by Shellac
- Released: October 1993
- Length: 8:11
- Label: Touch and Go

Shellac chronology
The Rude Gesture: A Pictorial History (1993)	Uranus (1993)	The Bird Is the Most Popular Finger (1994)

Professional ratings
Review scores
Source	Rating
AllMusic	4/5 stars

Uranus is the second release by American noise rock band Shellac, a two-song 7" on Touch and Go Records. It was released in 1993 on vinyl format only. It is believed that it was recorded at the same time as their first release, The Rude Gesture: A Pictorial History. As their first release had printed liner notes listing the microphones used during the recording, this release listed details about the recording tape, tape machines, and mastering equipment used.

== Track listing ==
=== Side A ===
1. "Doris" – 3:11

=== Side B ===
1. "Wingwalker" – 5:00

== Credits ==
- Steve Albini – guitar, vocals, recording engineer
- Robert S. Weston IV – bass guitar, backing vocals, recording engineer
- Todd Trainer – drums
