= The Bird Is the Most Popular Finger =

1994 EP by Shellac

EP by Shellac
- Released: August 22, 1994
- Genre: Post-hardcore
- Label: Drag City

Shellac chronology
| Uranus (1993) | The Bird Is the Most Popular Finger (1994) | At Action Park (1994) |

Professional ratings
Review scores
| Source | Rating |
|---|---|
| AllMusic | 3/5 stars |

The Bird Is the Most Popular Finger is the third release by American noise rock band Shellac, a two-song 7" on Drag City. The title is a parodic reference to the album The Pigeon Is the Most Popular Bird by Six Finger Satellite, and was originally the title of an article on Shellac that appeared in the magazine Alternative Press after the release of the band's earlier releases. It was Shellac's first non-Touch and Go release.

The first song "The Admiral" is an instrumental version of a song that would later appear on Shellac's At Action Park album later that year. "XVI" is an alternate version of the song "Pull the Cup", also on At Action Park. Both songs were recorded in Todd Trainer's loft apartment, as documented by a photographic print included with the release. The liner notes detail every musical instrument and every piece of recording equipment used.

== Track listing ==
=== Side A ===
1. "The Admiral" – 2:33

=== Side B ===
1. "XVI" – 3:42

== Personnel ==
- Steve Albini – guitar, vocals, recording engineer
- Todd Trainer – drums
- Bob Weston – bass guitar, recording engineer
