= The Fix (band) =

Early 1980s hardcore punk band

- Origin: Lansing, Michigan
- Genres: Hardcore punk
- Years active: 1980–1982
- Labels: Touch and Go; Lost and Found
- Past members: Steve Miller; Craig Calvert; Mike Achtenberg; Jeff Wellman

The Fix was an early 1980s hardcore punk band from Lansing, Michigan, and one of the first bands to be signed to Touch and Go Records.

== History ==
The Fix was formed in March 1980 by Steve Miller (vocals), Craig Calvert (guitar), Mike Achtenberg (bass) and Jeff Wellman (drums). In March 1981, The Fix released a single on Touch and Go, "Vengeance" b/w "In this Town", in a small pressing of 200 copies. The first single has fetched up to $3,500 on eBay and is considered among the rarest punk rock records in existence. They also contributed the song "No Idols" to the 1981 Touch and Go compilation EP Process of Elimination.

In January 1982, Touch and Go released Jan's Rooms, a four-song 7-inch EP. The band played on several prominent bills, including shows with the Dead Kennedys, D.O.A., Flipper, Black Flag, and many other notable punk rock bands, before breaking up in early 1982.

== Later projects ==
In early 1982, Miller and Achtenberg formed Blight, which also featured Tesco Vee of the Meatmen as vocalist. During the band's four-month existence, they recorded an eponymous 7-inch EP, released posthumously in 1983.

In 1983, Miller played guitar briefly in Strange Fruit, which also featured Steve Shelley of Sonic Youth on drums. They issued one three-song 7-inch single with Miller, "On Top of a Hill" (1983, Babel Records).

Wellman, meanwhile, moved back to Northern Michigan and became a real estate agent in Boyne City. Calvert played with other bands, most recently a Chicago-based blues outfit.

Miller is currently a journalist based in Lansing, and was nominated for a 2001 Pulitzer Prize by The New York Times. He is the author of eight books including Touch and Go: The Complete Hardcore Punk Zine '79-'83 (2010) and the bestseller Detroit Rock City: The Uncensored History of Rock 'n' Roll in America's Loudest City (2013).

== Reissues ==
In 1990, German label Lost and Found Records released a double LP called Cold Days, compiling all six songs from the two singles, the compilation track, four outtakes and 12 live songs.

In 2006, Touch and Go reissued all of this material on CD in 2006 as At the Speed of Twisted Thought..., augmented by additional outtakes and a live cover of the Germs' "Media Blitz".

== Band members ==
- Steve Miller – vocals
- Craig Calvert – guitar
- Mike Achtenburg – bass
- Jeff Wellman – drums

== Discography ==
=== Singles and EPs ===
- "Vengeance" 7-inch single (1981, Touch and Go Records)
- Jan's Rooms 7-inch EP (1982, Touch and Go Records)

=== Compilation albums ===
- Cold Days LP (1990, Lost and Found Records)
- At the Speed of Twisted Thought... CD (2006, Touch and Go Records)
