= Blight (band) =

Hardcore punk band from Lansing

- Origin: Lansing, Michigan, United States
- Genres: Hardcore punk
- Years active: 1982
- Label: Touch and Go
- Past members: Tesco Vee; Steve Miller; Mike Achtenberg; Pat Clarke

Blight was an American hardcore punk supergroup from Lansing, Michigan, which was formed in early 1982 and existed for four months, releasing one posthumous EP.

== History ==
Blight was formed by the Meatmen's Tesco Vee, the Fix's Steve Miller and Mike Achtenberg, and Pat Clark. They came together in Lansing, Michigan in 1982 after the Fix broke up. They opened for some notable acts including the Dead Kennedys.

The band only stayed together for four months, and finally broke up later in 1982.

The band's only release, a self-titled EP recorded in the basement studio of Corey Rusk, was released posthumously by Touch and Go Records in 1983.

On March 21, 2006, Touch and Go released a Blight compilation, Detroit : The Dream Is Dead - The Collected Works of a Midwest Hardcore Noise Band 1982.

== Band members ==
- Tesco Vee - vocals
- Steve Miller - guitar
- Mike Achtenberg - bass
- Pat Clark - drums

== Discography ==
=== EPs ===
- Blight 7" (1983, Touch and Go Records)

=== Compilation albums ===
- Detroit : The Dream Is Dead - The Collected Works of a Midwest Hardcore Noise Band 1982 (2006, Touch and Go Records)

=== Compilation appearances ===
- "Blight" on Meathouse 1 (1982, Version Sound)
- "Prophet of Doom" on Annoy Your Neighbor With This Tape! (1982, Chainsaw Tapes )
