= Necro =

Necro- is a prefix related to death, for example:

- Necromancy, a type of magic involving communication with the dead
- Necrophages, animals that feed on decomposing dead animal biomass
- Necrophilia, the sexual attraction to corpses
- Necropolis, a large ancient cemetery

Necro may refer to:

- Necro (Street Fighter), a character from the Street Fighter III series
- Necros, an early American hardcore punk band
- Necro (rapper) (born 1976), an American rapper
