= We're The Meatmen...and You Suck!! =

We're The Meatmen...And You Suck!!

Live album by The Meatmen
- Released: 1983
- Recorded: 1982–1983
- Genre: Hardcore Punk
- Label: Touch and Go

The Meatmen chronology
We're The Meatmen...And You Suck!! (1983)	War of the Superbikes (1985)

Professional ratings
Review scores
Source	Rating
Allmusic	3/5 stars

We're The Meatmen...And You Suck!! is an album by the Michigan hardcore punk band The Meatmen, which was released in 1983 on Touch and Go Records. Despite the fact that this is a live recording, it's sometimes referred to as the band's first album. Some sources list it as a compilation album. The first seven tracks are from the band's 1982 EP Blüd Sausage, while the rest of the album was recorded in front of a live audience in New York City.

== Track listing ==
1. "The Rap" / "Tooling For Anus"
2. "One Down, Three to Go"
3. "Snuff 'Em"
4. "Becoming a Man / Freud Was Wrong"
5. "I've Got a Problem"
6. "I'm Glad I'm Not a Girl"
7. "Dumping Ground"
8. "Meatmen Stomp" (Live)
9. "Mister Tapeworm" (Live)
10. "Orgy of One" (Live)
11. "I Sin for a Living" (Live)
12. "Crippled Children Suck" (Live)
13. "Buttocks" (Live)
14. "Middle Aged Youth" (Live)
15. "Meat Crimes" (Live)
16. "Mystery Track" (Live)

== Personnel ==
- Tesco Vee – Vocals
- Rich Ramsey – Guitar/Bass
- Greg Ramsey – Guitar
- Mike Achtenburg – Bass
- Mr. X – Drums
- Berl Johnson – Drums
