= Arcwelder =

Punk rock band from Minnesota formed in 1988

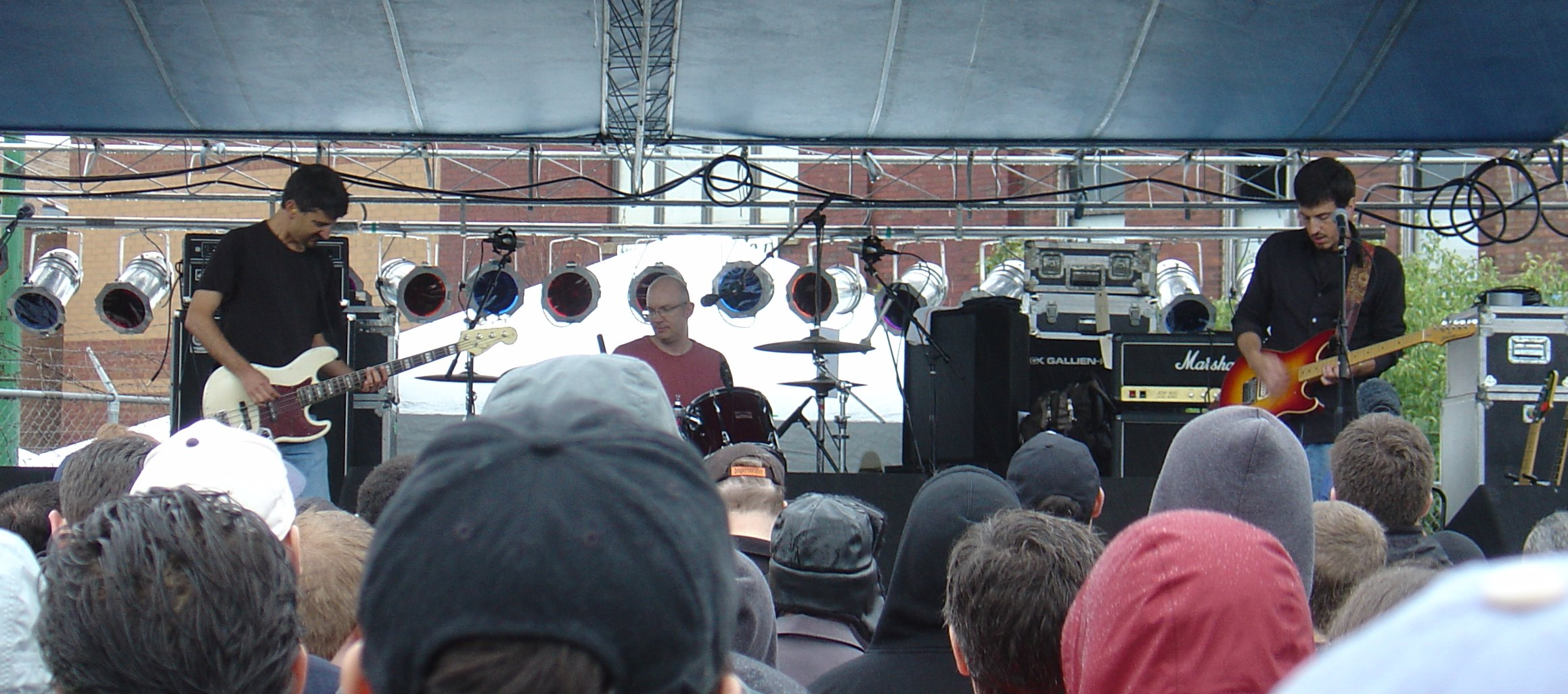
- Arcwelder performing at Touch and Go Records' 25th anniversary in 2006. Left to right: Rob Graber, Scott Macdonald, and Bill Graber.

Background information
- Also known as: Tilt-A-Whirl (1987–1990)
- Origin: Minneapolis, Minnesota, United States
- Genres: Punk rock; alternative rock
- Years active: 1987–present
- Labels: Touch and Go
- Members: Bill Graber; Rob Graber; Scott Macdonald
- Website: www.arcwelderband.com

Arcwelder is an American punk rock band from Minneapolis, Minnesota, formed in 1987. The band, a perennial local favorite, consists of brothers Rob and Bill Graber and Scott Macdonald, all of whom share in songwriting and singing.

The band released six albums between 1990 and 1999, including Pull and Jacket Made in Canada. Pitchfork writer Ryan Schreiber called them one of the best Minnesota bands of the 1990s.

== History ==
Under their original name Tilt-A-Whirl, the band released their first album, This, in 1990 on the small Minneapolis label Big Money, Inc. As the record was being released, the band was sued for trademark infringement by Sellner Manufacturing, the manufacturer of the Tilt-A-Whirl amusement ride. Rather than go to court, the band changed their name to Arcwelder, the title of an instrumental on the record. The initial release of This had a disclaimer sticker noting the lack of affiliation between the ride's manufacturer and the band.

Arcwelder has toured the U.S., with such bands as the Jesus Lizard, Jawbox, and Tar, and has played shows with such artists as Dirty Three, Pegboy, Caspar Brötzmann, and Cows.

In 1992, the song "Favor", from the album Jacket Made in Canada, appeared at number 32 on John Peel's "Festive Fifty".

Magnet magazine called Arcwelder's third album, 1993's Pull, "a 45-minute masterpiece that still holds its own against almost anything from indie rock’s glory years."

Arcwelder's final album, Everest, was released in 1999. Reviewing the album for CMJ New Music Monthly, Mike Wolf wrote that Arcwelder's career showed a singular focus: "Over the years, the trio has done one thing and one thing only: tirelessly propulsive, rhythmic, catchy rock" of a particularly Midwestern and, by 1999, unfashionable kind. Wolf went on to say that this was not a weakness in their music, but that "they've established themselves as the only practitioners of this style of rock that matter. Everest shows Arcwelder nearing perfection in its craft."

In both 2002 and 2012, Arcwelder was invited to perform in the UK All Tomorrow's Parties music festival, by those years' curators Shellac. The names of all three members of Arcwelder appear on the cover of the 1997 Shellac album The Futurist.

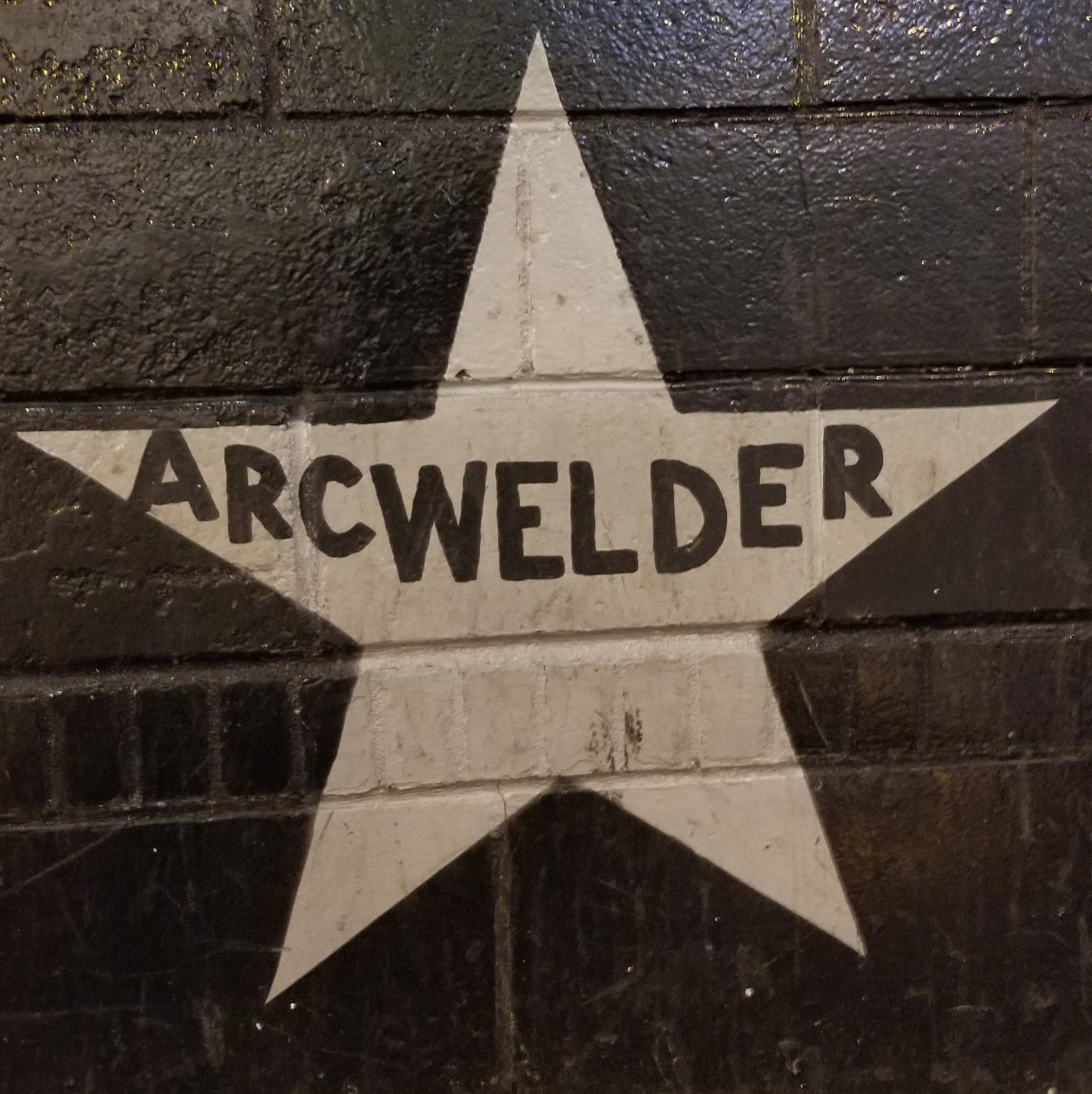
Arcwelder's star on the outside mural of the Minneapolis nightclub First Avenue

The band has been honored with a star on the outside mural of the Minneapolis nightclub First Avenue, recognizing performers that have played sold-out shows or have otherwise demonstrated a major contribution to the culture at the iconic venue. Receiving a star "might be the most prestigious public honor an artist can receive in Minneapolis," according to journalist Steve Marsh.

All of the original members of the band reformed for a performance at the Touch and Go 25th anniversary celebration held September 8–10, 2006 in Chicago, Illinois.

The band did not release any new music between 1999 and 2023, but continued to tour.

In December 2023, 24 years after Everest, Arcwelder released two new songs, "Lafayette" and "Take It Slow," on its website. A full new album was released in January 2024, titled Continue. The songs were recorded by Jason Orris at Minneapolis studio The Terrarium, and mixed by J. Robbins of Washington, D.C., punk band Jawbox.

== Discography ==
=== Albums ===
- This (1990)
- Jacket Made In Canada (1991)
- Pull (1993)
- Xerxes (1994)
- Entropy (1996)
- Everest (1999)
- Continue (2024)

=== 7" Singles ===
- "Pint Of Blood" b/w "Define My Life" (Sonic Boom Records, 1988)
- "Favor" b/w "Plastic" (Douphonic/ Big Money Inc, 1992)
- "I Am The Walrus" b/w "Sign Of The Times" (Big Money Inc, 1992)
- "Raleigh" b/w "Rosa, Walls" (Touch and Go, 1992)
