= WSoD =

WSoD or WSOD may refer to:

- White Screen of Death
- World Series of Darts
- "WSOD", a song by Shellac from To All Trains
