= Juggalo: Insane Clown Posse, Their Fans, and the World They Made =

2016 book by Steve Miller

- First edition
- Author: Steve Miller
- Language: English
- Subject: Insane Clown Posse, Fanatics, Rap, Rock and Roll,
- Genre: Music
- Publisher: Da Capo Press
- Publication date: July 12, 2016
- Publication place: United States

Juggalo: Insane Clown Posse, Their Fans, and the World They Made is a book by Steve Miller, a Michigan-based journalist. It chronicles the cult following of the Insane Clown Posse and its Psychopathic Records imprint. It was released in July 2016 by Da Capo Press.

Vice Media said the book "examines how Insane Clown Posse went from a small Detroit rap group to a band on Disney’s record label to on the FBI’s gang list." . It also said the book "interweaves two stories: how Violent J and Shaggy 2 Dope escaped Detroit's impoverished suburbs to create a new music genre with great financial success and why the FBI has labeled the Juggalos as an organized gang."

== About the book ==
According to Miller's website, the book focuses on its dedicated fans, aka juggalos, who've been questionably labeled a gang by the F.B.I. Here is a snippet of the book's description: "The FBI is certain this family is dangerous. Come see how the FBI has again failed to shoot straight and enter the world of ICP, Juggalos and their endeavor to live free."

== About the Author ==
Miller, a journalist and Edgar-nominated author, previously covered Insane Clown Posse in his Detroit Rock City and various magazine features, including a 2015 High Times article. Miller also covered the 2014 Gathering of the Juggalos for The Daily Beast.
