= The Futurist =

The Futurist may refer to:

- The Futurist (magazine), published by the World Future Society
- The Futurist (Shellac album), 1997
- The Futurist (Robert Downey Jr. album), 2004
- "The Futurist Manifesto", a 1909 essay by Italian poet Filippo Tommaso Marinetti
- The Futurist Cinema, Liverpool, a cinema in England
- Futurist Theatre in Scarborough, North Yorkshire

== See also ==
- Futurism (disambiguation)
