= Futurism (disambiguation) =

Futurism is an artistic and social movement that originated in Italy in the early 20th century.

Futurists are people specializing or interested in the study of the future.

Futurism or futurist may also refer to:

== Cultural movements ==
- Futurism (Christianity), an interpretation of the Bible in Christian eschatology
- Futurism (literature), a modernist avant-garde movement in literature
- Futurist architecture, an architectural movement begun in Italy in 1904
- Africanfuturism, an African subculture and literature genre
- Afrofuturism, an African-American and African diaspora subculture
- Anglofuturism, a British cultural and political movement
- Cubo-Futurism, the main school of painting and sculpture practiced by the Russian Futurists
- Ego-Futurism, a Russian literary movement of the 1910s
- Indigenous Futurism, a movement consisting of art, literature, comics, games
- Neo-futurism, a contemporary art and architecture movement
- Retrofuturism, a modern art movement
- Russian Futurism, a movement of Russian poets and artists

== Music ==
- Futurism (music), a movement in music

=== Albums ===
- Musica Futurista, an album of Futurist music
- Futurist (Alec Empire album), 2005
- Futurist (Keeno album), 2016
- The Futurist (Robert Downey Jr. album), 2004
- The Futurist (Shellac album), 1997
- Futurism, an album by Danny Tenaglia

=== Songs ===
- "Futurism", a bonus track from the Muse album Origin of Symmetry
- "Futurism", from the Deerhunter album Why Hasn't Everything Already Disappeared?

== Other uses ==
- Futurism (website), a science and technology news website
- Futurist (comics), a Marvel Comics character
- Retro Futurism, a Korean play
- Futurist Theatre, a theatre and cinema in Scarborough, North Yorkshire, England
- Futurist Political Party, an Italian political party
- Futurist (music genre), a style of electronic and new wave music coined by Sounds magazine in the early 1980s

== See also ==
- Futures studies, also known as futurology, the study of possible futures
- The Futurist (disambiguation)
