= The Rude Gesture: A Pictorial History =

1993 EP by Shellac

EP by Shellac
- Released: October 10, 1993
- Genre: Post-hardcore
- Label: Touch and Go

Shellac chronology
The Rude Gesture: A Pictorial History (1993)	Uranus (1993)

Professional ratings
Review scores
Source	Rating
AllMusic	4/5 stars

The Rude Gesture: A Pictorial History is the first release by American noise rock band Shellac, a three-song 7" on Touch and Go Records. It was released in 1993 on vinyl format only. The brown smear on the cover was originally rumored to be real shellac, but is actually root beer concentrate.

The 7" comes in a hand-printed and folded sleeve with a sheet of liner notes which list the microphones used for recording, like "Lomo: 19a-19, 19a-13, 19a-9 (original Soviet tubes, for the prole sound)".

== Track listing ==
=== Side A ===
1. "The Guy Who Invented Fire"
2. "Rambler Song"

=== Side B ===
1. "Billiard Player Song"

== Personnel ==
- Steve Albini – vocals, guitar, recording engineer
- Bob Weston – bass guitar, recording engineer (on "The Guy Who Invented Fire" and "Billiard Player Song")
- Todd Trainer – drums
- Camilo Gonzalez (formerly of Naked Raygun) – bass guitar on "Rambler Song"
