= John G. McKnight =

American engineer (1931–2022)

Jay McKnight
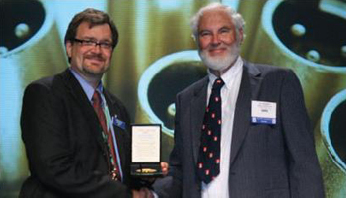
- Bob Moses (left) giving McKnight (right) the Audio Engineering Society Distinguished Service Medal Award for 2008
- Born: John G. McKnight; February 11, 1931; Seattle, Washington, U.S.
- Died: November 5, 2022 (aged 91); Cupertino, California, U.S.
- Education: Stanford University (BS)
- Known for: Co-founder of the Magnetic Reference Laboratory
- Spouse: Brigitte McKnight
- Children: 4

John Gould "Jay" McKnight (February 11, 1931 – November 5, 2022) was an American businessman and engineer who was the co-founder of the Magnetic Reference Laboratory, where he was engineering vice-president from 1972 to 1975 and was the president since 1975. He also developed new products and directed engineering at MRL.

== Early life and education ==
John Gould McKnight was born in Seattle, Washington on February 11, 1931. He received his Bachelor of Science degree in electrical engineering from Stanford University in 1952.

== Career ==
McKnight worked for Ampex from 1952 through 1972. From 1953 to 1956, McKnight served in the United States Army as a part of the American Forces Network in New York City, where he also worked at the Gotham Recording studio.

At Ampex, he worked in the magnetic recording research group, the stereo tape division, and the professional audio division. In addition to research, he also worked on the design of the CinemaScope reproducer system; the Models 350, PR-10, and MR-70; improvements in the high-speed duplication system and operating procedures at the Ampex Music (Stereo Tape) Division; and he developed the "Ampex Master Equalization" (AME). He has published more than 70 technical papers, mostly in the Journal of the Audio Engineering Society (AES), on the theory and practice of magnetic recording, and on audio engineering. He received the Audio Engineering Society's Publication Award in 1982.

From 1972 to 1974, he also was a consultant to Scully/Metrotech in Mountain View, California, and to MCI in Ft. Lauderdale, Florida, on audio systems and magnetic recording.

=== Les Paul ===
When Les Paul got the Ampex eight-track machine, he realized that he would need a custom built console to work with the new multitrack recorder. He hired Rein Narma (chief engineer at Fairchild Recording Equipment) to do the job. McKnight had worked with Narma at Gotham Audio in New York and wound up helping with some of the design and layout, as well as installation.

=== Nixon tapes ===
In 1973 and 1974 he was a member of Judge John Sirica's "Advisory Panel on White House Tapes". As a part of his testimony,

The first purpose, I recall, was to try to make the tapes that they found more understandable. But before very long they found out that there was an 18-minute gap in one of the tapes, and that's what the panel focused on. What we were able to do was verify which machines had made the recordings and which had been used to erase the recordings. The recordings were made on a Sony Model 800B, a little consumer kind of machine... it ran 15/16ths inches per second, and Nixon's staff had attached a sound-activated start and stop feature. And the Secret Service came through every evening and put new roll of tape on it if it had run out of tape. The machine that was used in the erasure was an Uher 5000, a commonly used German dictation recorder. What we could establish was that you can hear the clicks where the machine's been put in and out of recording mode. And we could establish that the clicks were in fact from going in and out of recording. We could say that the likelihood that it was done accidentally was incredibly remote. The erasing machine was put in and out of recording mode six times, so judge for yourself how likely that was to have been accidental.

== Personal life and death ==
Jay and his wife Brigitte had four adult sons. He died on November 5, 2022, at the age of 91.

== Awards and honors ==
- 1960 — Fellow of the AES
- 1971 — AES Award
- 1978 — President of the AES
- 1979 — Honorary Member of the AES
- 1990 — AES Board of Governors Award
- 2008 — Distinguished Service Medal Award, for extraordinary service to the society and contributions to the advancement of knowledge in magnetic recording over a period of more than 50 years
