= If Society =

Finnish independent record label

- Founded: 1999
- Founder: Tommi Forsström and Mikko Heikkonen
- Distributor(s): Töölön Musiikkitukku (Finland), Stickfigure Distribution (US)
- Genre: Indie
- Country of origin: Finland
- Location: Helsinki, Finland
- Official website: http://www.ifsociety.com

If Society is an independent record label from Helsinki, Finland.

== Roster ==
- Black Audio
- Echo Is Your Love
- Fun
- Frivolvol
- Hero Dishonest
- Ninetynine
- Radiopuhelimet
- Siniaalto
- Valse Triste
- Viola

== Discography ==
=== Albums ===
- Fun: Zu-pa! (2007)
- Radiopuhelimet: Viisi tähteä (2007)
- Valse Triste: Madon luku (2006)
- Ninetynine: Worlds of Population, Worlds of Space, Worlds of Robots (2006)
- Echo Is Your Love: Humansize (2006)
- Black Audio: Iron Rhino (2006)
- Viola: Anything Can Stop Us (2005)
- Boys of Scandinavia: Kill the Party (2005)
- Red Carpet: The Noise of Red Carpet (2005)
- Frivolvol: Frivolous vol 2: The False Security Program (2005)
- Hero Dishonest: Juggernaut + Let Your Poison Scream (2005)
- Viola: Melancholydisco (2005)
- Rytmihäiriö: Saatana on Herra (2005)
- Echo Is Your Love: Paper Cut Eye (2004)
- Fun: Szklarska Poreba LP (2004)
- Hero Dishonest: Let Your Poison Scream (2004)
- Siniaalto: Tallentumia (2004)
- Viola: Tearcandy (2004)
- Siniaalto: Siniaalto (2002)
- Hero Dishonest: Juggernaut (2002)
- Echo Is Your Love: 8 Hours (2002)
- Hero Dishonest: Pleasure/ Disgust (2001)
- Echo Is Your Love: Sheets of Blank Fucking Paper (2000)
- V/A: Rantings Of A Free Thinker (2000)
- Sissy Spacek: Telegram before departure (1999)
