= At the Speed of Twisted Thought... =

Compilation album by The Fix
- Released: October 10, 2006
- Recorded: August 1980 – July 1981
- Genre: Hardcore punk
- Label: Touch and Go

Professional ratings
Review scores
Source	Rating
AllMusic	4.5/5 stars

At the Speed of Twisted Thought... is a compilation album by Lansing, Michigan-based–hardcore punk band the Fix, released by Touch and Go Records in 2006, 24 years after the Fix disbanded.

== Track listing ==
1. "Vengeance" – 1:26
2. "In this Town" – 1:20
3. "Cos the Elite" – 1:19
4. "Truth Right Now" – 1:30
5. "Signals" – 3:37
6. "Off to War" – 1:33
7. "No Idols" – 1:36
8. "Candy Store" – 1:14
9. "Famous" – 1:45
10. "Vengeance" [Outtake] – 1:21
11. "Celebre" [Outtake] – 1:40
12. "Rat Patrol" [Outtake] – 1:42
13. "Cos the Elite" [live] – 1:31
14. "The Letter" [live] – 0:48
15. "Famous" [live] – 1:40
16. "Off to War" [live] – 1:39
17. "In this Town" [live] – 1:28
18. "Rat Patrol" [live] – 1:41
19. "Statement" [live] – 1:17
20. "Candy Store" [live] – 1:12
21. "You" [live] – 0:48
22. "Teenage Drugs" [live] – 0:55
23. "Waiting for Eviction" [live] – 2:14
24. "Media Blitz" [live] – 1:36
