= At Action Park =

1994 album by Shellac

Studio album by Shellac
- Released: 1994
- Recorded: March 1994
- Studios: Southern (London); Black Box (Noyant-la-Gravoyère)
- Genres: Post-hardcore; math rock; noise rock
- Length: 37:03
- Label: Touch and Go
- Producer: Shellac

Shellac chronology
The Bird Is the Most Popular Finger (1994)	At Action Park (1994)	The Futurist (1997)

At Action Park is the debut studio album by American noise rock band Shellac, released in 1994.

== Packaging ==
The release came in a folded and hand-pressed sleeve which is referred as uni-pak style album jacket. The inner sleeve shows artwork with four microphones, the record sleeve shows an illustration of a fictionalized map of Action Park on one side, and a lengthy medical text Resuscitation from apparent death by electric shock on the other side (the text was found in an old electronics textbook of Weston's). The vinyl had inscriptions in the run-out groove of both sides, reading: "Smoking is as natural as breathing. They've been doing it since before I was born... ... which is a shame, because I could have invented it. - Todd Stanford Trainer 1994"

== Reception ==
Professional ratings
Review scores
Source	Rating
AllMusic	4.5/5 stars
Chicago Sun-Times	3.5/4 stars
Chicago Tribune	3.5/4 stars
The Encyclopedia of Popular Music	4/5 stars
The Great Rock Discography	6/10
Guitar World	3.5/5 stars
MusicHound Rock	4/5 stars
OndaRock	9/10
The Rolling Stone Album Guide	4/5 stars
Select	3/5 medals

The album received highly positive reviews on release. Greg Kot wrote that the "music is still punishing in the extreme, with melody subservient to groove and dynamics, and the human voice just another instrument in a maelstrom", going on to write that "Albini uses his guitar more for color and texture rather than as a lead instrument, while bassist Bob Weston and drummer Todd Trainer create a vicious spin-cycle groove, punctuated by thrilling ebbs and leaps in volume and tempo" and called the engineering "extraordinary". In Guitar World, David Grad wrote, "The trio clearly view themselves as craftsmen, partners in a well-oiled machine, with Trainer and Weston generating the rhythmic line of attack with precision while Albini's guitar responds with storm after storm of skittering sonic steel."

Retrospectively, AllMusic's Mark Deming wrote that despite Albini's continued obsession with "sex, violence, and anti-social behavior" from his Big Black days and while "the hard, metallic guitar figures of "Pull the Cup" and "Song of the Minerals" were as uncompromisingly abrasive as ever", the album revealed "a band more musically intelligent and imaginative" than his former band.

In 2012, Fact ranked it the 18th best album of the 1990s, calling it "brilliantly angular [...] Combining Minutemen-esque grooves that feel like they could last forever with spit-riddled, sneering vocals and a storming rhythm section, there are few albums that sound as simultaneously doomed and driven as At Action Park."

=== Legacy ===
Christian Lemach of Whores called At Action Park his favorite noise rock album of all time. Mike Sullivan of Russian Circles cited this album, alongside Fugazi's Red Medicine, as major influences on his guitar-playing, noting that they "literally changed the way [he] looked at music". Electronic producer Clark included the album among his favorites, noting that "there's almost a techno element to it, it feels blocky, like it's made out of angles rather than anything circular, but still the production's quite warm, it just draws you in."

== Track listing ==
No.	Title	Length
1.	"My Black Ass"	3:00
2.	"Pull the Cup"	4:12
3.	"The Admiral"	2:21
4.	"Crow"	4:47
5.	"Song of the Minerals"	4:24
6.	"A Minute"	3:40
7.	"The Idea of North"	3:42
8.	"Dog and Pony Show"	3:59
9.	"Boche's Dick"	1:38
10.	"Il Porno Star"	5:14
Total length:		37:03

== Credits ==
Personnel:

- Steve Albini – velocity (guitar/vocals)
- Robert S. Weston IV – mass (bass/vocals)
- Todd Trainer – time (drums)

Staff:

- John Loder – driver
- Iain Burgess – chef
- Peter Diemel – coffee
- Corey Rusk – pyrotechnics
