= 1000 Hurts =

2000 album by Shellac

Studio album by Shellac
- Released: August 8, 2000
- Recorded: 1998–1999
- Genres: Noise rock; post-hardcore; math rock
- Length: 36:51
- Label: Touch & Go
- Producer: Shellac

Shellac chronology
Terraform (1998)	1000 Hurts (2000)	Excellent Italian Greyhound (2007)

Professional ratings
Review scores
Source	Rating
AllMusic	4/5 stars
The Encyclopedia of Popular Music	3/5 stars
The Great Rock Discography	8/10
The Guardian	4/5 stars
NME	4.5/5 stars
OndaRock	6.5/10
Pitchfork	8.3/10
Rock Hard	8.5/10
Rolling Stone	2/5 stars
The New Rolling Stone Album Guide	3.5/5 stars

1000 Hurts is the fourth studio album by American rock band Shellac, released on August 8, 2000. In its official promotional materials Shellac jokingly referenced their previous release by describing this album as follows: "There are no 12-minute songs on this one. This record is more mean-spirited. Todd sings."

The cover is a clear homage to old Ampex audio recording tape boxes. The band are known for using analog tape for their recordings, and are fans of Ampex tape and tape recorders. The speech at the start of the record is a variation on the announcements one would hear on Magnetic Reference Laboratory's calibration tapes for analog tape recorders. The title refers to one-thousand Hertz (rendered 1000 Hz), a measure used in audio recording describing a sine wave cycling 1,000 times per second.

1000 Hurts was named Rockfeedback's record of the decade, in 2009. Jehnny Beth of Savages named the album one of her biggest influences, saying that it had made her "want to be a bassist".

== Track listing ==
Side A
No.	Title	Length
1.	"Prayer to God"	2:50
2.	"Squirrel Song"	2:38
3.	"Mama Gina"	5:43
4.	"QRJ"	2:52
5.	"Ghosts"	3:36

Side B
No.	Title	Length
1.	"Song Against Itself"	4:13
2.	"Canaveral"	2:38
3.	"New Number Order"	1:39
4.	"Shoe Song"	5:17
5.	"Watch Song"	5:25

== Personnel ==
- Shellac:
  - Steve Albini – electric guitar, vocals
  - Todd Trainer – drums, vocals
  - Bob Weston – bass guitar, vocals
- Bill Skibbe – tape operator
- Rob Bochnik – tape operator
- Greg Norman – tape operator
- John Loder – mastering
- Steve Rooke – mastering

== Charts ==
Album – Billboard (North America)

Year	Chart	Position
2000	Top Heatseekers	49
