= To All Trains =

Studio album by Shellac
- Released: May 17, 2024
- Recorded: November 5–6, 2017; October 18–21, 2019; September 1–6, 2021; March 2–3, 2022
- Studios: Electrical Audio, Chicago, Illinois, US
- Genres: Math rock; post-punk
- Length: 28:13
- Label: Touch and Go
- Producer: Shellac

Shellac chronology
The End of Radio (2019)	To All Trains (2024)

"It's marketing, which is maybe my most hated thing on earth. Like, fascism is up there, but marketing is right behind, you know?"

— Shellac guitarist Steve Albini on the decision to not send out promotional copies of any of their records to press outlets

To All Trains is the seventh and final studio album by American rock band Shellac, released by Touch and Go Records on May 17, 2024. It was their first studio album in a decade and the final recording made before guitarist Steve Albini's death just ten days prior to the album's release.

The album was recorded over several years and was not promoted with advance copies, specific tour dates, or singles.

== Reception ==
Professional ratings
Aggregate scores
Source	Rating
AnyDecentMusic?	7.9/10
Metacritic	84/100
Review scores
Source	Rating
AllMusic	4/5 stars
Clash	9/10
Kerrang!	4/5
Louder Sound	4/5 stars
Louder Than War	5/5
Mojo	4/5 stars
Pitchfork	8.1/10
The Scotsman	3/5 stars
Spin	B+
Sputnikmusic	4.2/5

To All Trains received largely positive reviews. According to the review aggregator Metacritic, To All Trains received "universal acclaim" based on a weighted average score of 84 out of 100 from 7 critic scores. Writing for AllMusic, critic Mark Deming stated that "it's practically impossible to listen to the music without hearing it through the filter of grief, which is odd, since this is music that sounds muscular, vital, and very much alive" and the band is "a lean, mean math rock machine... [with] concision of the songs [that] makes this a breathless, energetic listening experience". Lux Sparks-Pescovitz of BoingBoing recommended this album to anyone, including those unfamiliar with Albini's previous work and favorably compared this album to blues rock, the Raconteurs, and David Bowie's final studio album, Blackstar. At Clash Music, Cal Cashin described the album as "beat-em-up mutant rock" that "showcases a rock band who get every single thing about being a rock band absolutely correct". In Kerrang!, Olly Thomas hailed the release as "a masterclass in delivering musical precision with an undercarriage of scuzz and tension".

Paul Brannigan at Louder Sound characterized it as "as thrillingly intense, darkly amusing and pleasingly unsentimental as expected" with emotions that are "grinding [and] typically unsentimental" as well as silly, describing the music as a whole as "never less than compelling throughout, never less than a bleakly beautiful good time". At Louder Than War, John Robb awarded the album a perfect score and called it "another peep into the tight world of the band and another celebration of their minimalistic genius" that "sounds as thrilling and fresh as anything they have ever done". Editors at Pitchfork included this among a shortlist of the eight best albums of the week, calling it a "record of righteous, riotous noise", with critic Christopher R. Weingarten writing later on that it "naturally walks the same path and, had circumstances permitted, would likely have been appreciated simply as little more than Shellac's sixth excellent record".

Writing for PopMatters, Seth Troyer rated this album a 7 out of 10 and used the review to give an overview of Shellac and Steve Albini's career, noting that "it can be hard not to indulge in the creepy feeling that the person who has been telling you these ghost stories was himself a ghost the whole time" and stating that it "feels like a group showing up, punching in, doing the good work, getting the job done, and then punching out for a night at the bar". Online retailer Qobuz spotlighted this release and Jeff Laughlin called it "classic Shellac" with songs that "epitomizes Shellac's unique style" that invite "reflection on our collective folly". In Rolling Stone, Kory Grow called these songs a mixture of Albini's sarcasm and biting noise rock "with its snarling lyrics and crisp sound" that serves as an appropriate final statement. In a mixed review, Fiona Shepherd of The Scotsman called it Albini's "musical epitaph and testament to his tight partnership with bassist Bob Weston and mighty drummer Todd Trainer".

In a May 31 roundup of the best albums of the year, editors at Exclaim! ranked this 25 stating that this might be Shellac's best release. Staff at Consequence of Sound included this among the best albums of May, with Jonah Krueger writing that it "serves as a masterful, shockingly fitting project for Shellac, even down to the foreboding, black and white album cover" and a June 4 overview of the best albums of the year so far ranked it 17, where he called it "an idiosyncratic, irreverent, beautiful final offering from Albini and company". The same day, Stereogum did the same and ranked this album 20 and Tom Breihan characterized the release as "a document of a great American rock band, 30 years into its career, making the kind of spiky, scabrous post-punk that they always did better than anyone else". Online retailer Qobuz chose this as one of the five best rock albums of May.

== Track listing ==
All tracks are written by Steve Albini, Todd Trainer, and Bob Weston.

1. "WSOD" – 2:24
2. "Girl From Outside" – 2:46
3. "Chick New Wave" – 2:22
4. "Tattoos" – 3:08
5. "Wednesday" – 3:18
6. "Scrappers" – 2:21
7. "Days Are Dogs" – 1:42
8. "How I Wrote How I Wrote Elastic Man (cock & bull)" – 4:09
9. "Scabby the Rat" – 1:46
10. "I Don't Fear Hell" – 4:18

== Personnel ==
Shellac

- Steve Albini – guitar, vocals, recording, production, mastering at Chicago Mastering Service
- Todd Trainer – drums
- Bob Weston – bass guitar, vocals, mastering, photography

Additional personnel

- David Babbitt – sleeve design
- Matthew Barnhart – tape op
- Greg Norman – tape op
- Ungiedem Zaneta Ogar – live sound mixing
- Jon San Paolo – tape op
- Gregoire Yeche – tape op

== Charts ==
Chart performance for To All Trains
Chart (2024)	Peak position
Croatian International Albums (HDU)	36
German Albums (Offizielle Top 100)	44
Swiss Albums (Schweizer Hitparade)	84
Belgian Albums (Ultratop Flanders)	71
Scottish Albums (Official Charts)	12
