= Echo Is Your Love =

- Origin: Helsinki, Finland
- Genres: Noise rock, post-hardcore, indie rock
- Years active: 1998
- Label: If Society
- Members: Nea Helsto; Mikko Heikkonen; Ilai Rämä; Riku Korhonen; Antti Polvinen
- Past members: Tommi Forsström; Veli-Pekka Mikkola
- Website: ifsociety.com/echo

Echo Is Your Love is a Finnish noise rock band. It was founded in 1998, when Mikko Heikkonen and Ilai Rämä got acquainted with each other. The first gig was played after one rehearsal with the whole band.

The first tour abroad was made in 2001. The band toured a lot until recent years, including Britain, Russia and elsewhere in Europe and the United States. The band has released all its albums with the If Society label.

== Recordings ==
=== Albums ===
- Sheets of Blank Fucking Paper (2000)
- 8 hours (2002)
- Paper Cut Eye (2004)
- Humansize (2006)
- Heart Fake (2010)

=== Singles and EP's ===
- Saw Them Play Like Ghosts (7-inch, 1998)
- Echo Is Your Love / Kemialliset ystävät (split 12-inch, 1999)
- Echo Is Your Love / Warser Gate (split 7-inch, 1999)
- Frustration / Tired of My Eyes (7-inch, 2000)
- Echo Is Your Love / Electroscope (split 7-inch, 2000)
- Lion Tamer vs Tigers (2008)
- DNA / Six-Month Night (2016)
