= Excellent Italian Greyhound =

2007 album by Shellac

Studio album by Shellac
- Released: June 5, 2007
- Recorded: 2006
- Genres: Noise rock; post-hardcore; math rock; experimental rock
- Length: 42:19
- Label: Touch & Go
- Producer: Shellac

Shellac chronology
1000 Hurts (2000)	Excellent Italian Greyhound (2007)	Dude Incredible (2014)

Professional ratings
Aggregate scores
Source	Rating
Metacritic	78/100
Review scores
Source	Rating
AllMusic	4.5/5 stars
The A.V. Club	B−
The Boston Phoenix	3/4 stars
Drowned in Sound	7/10
OndaRock	7/10
Pitchfork Media	7.0/10
Rock Hard	9.0/10
Sputnikmusic	4.5/5 stars
Tiny Mix Tapes	3/5 stars

Excellent Italian Greyhound is the fifth studio album by the American rock band Shellac, released on June 5, 2007. The album's title is a reference to drummer Todd Trainer's Italian Greyhound, Uffizi, who appears on the album's cover. The album was recorded at Electrical Audio and mastered at Abbey Road by Steve Rooke. The drawings for Excellent Italian Greyhound were created by Jay Ryan from the band Dianogah. As well as a hand screened obi sleeve surrounding the jacket, there are several pictures taken by Joel Larson. As with 1000 Hurts, the vinyl pressing of the album includes an unmarked CD version at no extra charge (CD and LP+CD releases are similarly priced). The band encourages listeners to purchase the vinyl to hear the record as it was intended.

In November 2009, NME included the album on their list of "The Top 100 Greatest Albums of the Decade".

Voice-over artist Ken Nordine appears uncredited on the song "Genuine Lulabelle". The introduction to "Spoke" includes a cover version of the "Rotosound Strings" radio commercial from The Who's 1967 album The Who Sell Out.

In the run-out groove, there is a text etching. Side One - "Pronto Prova..." Side Two - "A Isamu Sta Lapa!"

The song "Genuine Lulabelle" features clips of the Homestar Runner character Strong Bad reciting lines from the song.

== Track listing ==
No.	Title	Length
1.	"The End of Radio"	8:27
2.	"Steady As She Goes"	4:06
3.	"Be Prepared"	4:05
4.	"Elephant"	4:24
5.	"Genuine Lulabelle"	9:17
6.	"Kittypants"	1:59
7.	"Boycott"	2:14
8.	"Paco"	5:29
9.	"Spoke"	2:18

== Charts ==
Album - Billboard (North America)

Year	Chart	Position
2007	Top Heatseekers	17
2007	Top Independent Albums	45
