= The Meatmen =

American punk band

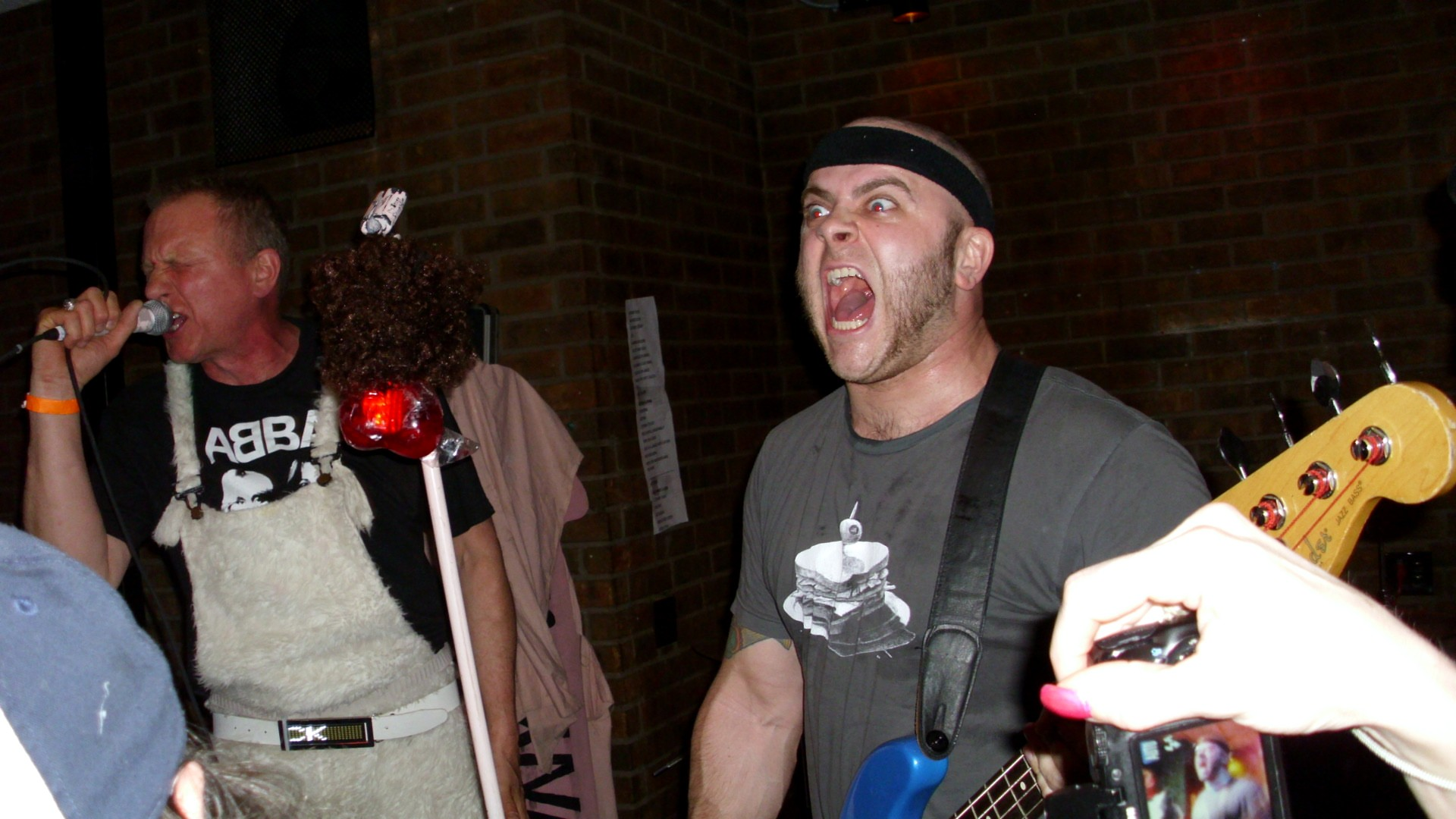

Background information
- Origin: Lansing, Michigan
- Genres: Punk rock, hardcore punk, heavy metal
- Years active: 1981–1988, 1993–1997, 2008–present
- Labels: Touch and Go, Homestead, Caroline, Meat King, Go-Kart, TKO, Self Destructo
- Members: Tesco Vee; Dan "Danny Dirtbag" Gillies; John "Swarthy 'Bun-Length' Franklin" Lehl
- Past members: See former members
- Website: the-meatmen.com

The Meatmen are an American punk band headed by Tesco Vee, originally existing from 1981 to 1988, before reforming in the mid-1990s, and again in the 2000s. They were known for their outrageous stage antics and offensive lyrics. They reformed in 2008 and continue to tour and record.

== History ==
The Meatmen formed in Lansing, Michigan, in 1981. The original band, existing with various lineups for approximately two years, first comprised vocalist Tesco Vee (a.k.a. Robert Vermeulen), guitarist Rich Ramsey, bassist Jim Forgey and drummer Mr. X.

The Meatmen made their recorded debut with the song "Meatmen Stomp", which appeared on the 1981 7-inch compilation EP Process of Elimination, released in 1981 on Touch and Go Records (an offshoot of Touch and Go fanzine, which Vee co-founded in 1979).

The band's first 7-inch EP, Blüd Sausage, was released in 1982 on Touch and Go. By this time, Gregg Ramsey had joined on guitar, with his brother Rich switching to bass, replacing Forgey. For their second EP, Crippled Children Suck, issued later that same year, Vee and Rich Ramsey (now on guitar) were joined by two new members, bassist Mike Achtenburg (formerly of the Fix) and drummer Berl Johnson. Also in 1982, Vee and Achtenberg played in the brief punk supergroup Blight.

In 1983, the Meatmen issued a full-length album, We're the Meatmen...and You Suck!!, compiling the first EP on side A, and live material recorded at New York City's Mudd Club on side B.

Vee then relocated from Michigan to Washington D.C. in the fall of 1983, dissolving the Crippled Children Suck lineup and assembling a new band consisting of members of several DC hardcore bands. Vee then released the 1984 EP, Dutch Hercules, credited to Tesco Vee and the Meatkrew, before reforming the Meatmen with a rotating cast of members including Todd Swalla of Necros and Brian Baker and Lyle Preslar of Minor Threat. During this period, the band changed their approach dramatically to a more heavy metal sound.

Their first actual studio album, War of the Superbikes, was released in 1985 on Homestead Records, featuring a lineup of Vee, guitarists Baker and Preslar, bassist Graham McCulloch (ex-Negative Approach), and drummer Eric Zelsdorf. For the 1986 follow-up Rock 'N' Roll Juggernaut, released on Caroline Records, lead guitarist James Cooper (later of Battalion of Saints) replaced Baker.

Following a solo Vee single, "Twisted Road", issued in 1987 by Forced Exposure under the name the Tesco Vee Experience, Caroline issued a live Meatmen album, We're the Meatmen... And You Still Suck! (1988), featuring covers of "Razamanaz" by Nazareth and "Rebel Rouser" by the Sweet. The lineup included Vee, Preslar, McCulloch and two new members, lead guitarist Stuart Casson and drummer Mark "Goolie" Kermanj.

In the early 1990s, Vee formed Tesco Vee's Hate Police, backed by guitarists Keith Campbell and Tommy "Dog" Cohen, bassist Scotty "Thorson" Slade and drummer Neil Ekberg (Campbell and Ekberg were also members of D.C. punk band Black Market Baby). The group released several EPs and one album, 1992's Gonzo Hate Vibe.

Vee then released three more albums with the Meatmen (including guitarist Norman Voss, bassist Mark Davis, and drummers Mark Glass and Rob San Pietro) in a metal-influenced punk style: Toilet Slave (1994, Meat King Records), Pope on a Rope (1995, also on Meat King) and War of the Superbikes II (1996, Go-Kart Records). They also released several EPs, including the "Drugs & Masturbation"/"True Grit" split 7-inch with Boris the Sprinkler and College Radio Loser 7-inch EP, both in 1995, and the 1996 sampler Evil in a League with Satan. Vee disbanded the Meatmen in 1996.

== Legacy ==
In 2000, Crazy Bastard Records released We're Not the Meatmen, But We Still Suck!, a compilation of covers of Meatmen songs by various punk artists including Fang and Anal Cunt.

== Reunion ==
A reunited 2008 Meatmen lineup included new members Ian "The Pit Viper" Sugierski on drums, Dave "Malarsh" Malosh (later of Electric Six) on guitar and Andy "Lord Vapid" Lucas on bass. This lineup toured the U.S. through 2009 and performed on that year's Cover the Earth covers album.

In 2010, Vee recruited members of Detroit-based stoner rock band Chapstik: guitarist Leighton Mann, bassist Dan "Danny Dirtbag" Gillies and drummer John "Swarthy 'Bun-Length' Franklin" Lehl. They released the Happy Fucking Easter, Asshole EP, featuring two Germs covers as B-sides, on TKO Records for Record Store Day 2011.

Mann was replaced by guitarist Kevin "Hindu Kush" Roberts from 2012-2016, first appearing on 2013's The Tribute with Two Heads split 7-inch with Antiseen.

In 2014, the Meatmen released a new full-length studio album, Savage Sagas, on Self Destructo Records.

== Band members ==
- Tesco Vee – vocals (1981–1988, 1993–1997, 2008–present)
- Dan Gillies – bass (2010–present)
- John Lehl – drums (2010–present)

=== Former members ===
- Rich Ramsey – guitar (1981, 1982–1983), bass (1981–1982)
- Jim Forgey – bass (1981)
- Mr. X – drums (1981–1982)
- Gregg Ramsey – guitar (1981–1982)
- Mike Achtenburg – bass (1982–1983)
- Todd Swalla a.k.a. Berl Johnson – drums (1982–1983)
- Lyle Preslar – lead/rhythm guitar (1983–1988)
- Brian Baker – lead guitar (1983–1985)
- Bert Quieroz – bass (1983–1984)
- Rich Moore – drums (1983–1984)
- Graham McCulloch – bass (1984–1988)
- Eric Zelsdorf – drums (1984–1987)
- James Cooper – lead guitar (1986–1987)
- Stuart Casson – lead guitar (1985–1986, 1987–1988)
- Mark "Gooly" Kermanj – drums (1987–1988)
- Norman Voss – guitar (1993–1997)
- Mark Davis – bass (1993–1997)
- Mark Glass – drums (1993–1995)
- Rob San Pietro – drums (1995–1997)
- Dave Malosh – guitar (2008–2010)
- Andy "Lord Vapid" Lucas – bass (2008–2010)
- Ian "The Pit Viper" Sugierski – drums (2008–2010)
- Leighton Mann – guitar (2010–2012)
- Kevin "Hindu Kush" Roberts – guitar (2012–2016)

== Discography ==
=== Studio albums ===
- 1985 – War of the Superbikes (Homestead)
- 1986 – Rock 'N' Roll Juggernaut (Caroline)
- 1994 – Toilet Slave (Meat King)
- 1995 – Pope on a Rope (Meat King)
- 1996 – War of the Superbikes II (Go-Kart)
- 2009 – Cover the Earth (Meat King)
- 2014 – Savage Sagas (Self Destructo)

=== Singles and EPs ===
- 1982 – Blüd Sausage 7-inch EP (Touch and Go)
- 1983 – Crippled Children Suck 7-inch EP (Touch and Go)
- 1984 – Dutch Hercules (as Tesco Vee and the Meatkrew) 12-inch EP (Touch and Go)
- 1985 – "The Making of War of the Superbikes" 7-inch flexidisc single (Caroline)
- 1986 – "Rock 'N' Roll Juggernaut... The True Story" 7-inch flexidisc single (Caroline)
- 1987 – Vintage Meat 7-inch single (Perpetual Disc)
- 1995 – "Drugs & Masturbation"/"True Grit" split 7-inch with Boris the Sprinkler (Bulge)
- 1995 – College Radio Loser 7-inch EP (self-released)
- 1996 – Evil in a League with Satan CD EP (Go-Kart)
- 2011 – Happy Fucking Easter, Asshole 7-inch EP (TKO)
- 2013 – The Tribute with Two Heads split 7-inch with Antiseen (TKO)

=== Live albums and EPs ===
- 1988 - We're the Meatmen... And You Still Suck! album (Caroline)
- 1996 – 3/3/95 (Empty Bottle - Chicago, IL) 7-inch EP (V.M.L.)

=== Compilation albums ===
- 1983 – We're the Meatmen...and You Suck!! (Blüd Sausage EP plus live set) (Touch and Go)
- 1990 – Crippled Children Suck (Touch and Go)
- 1990 – Stud Powercock: The Touch and Go Years 1981-1984 (Touch and Go)

=== Compilation appearances ===
- 1981 – "Meatmen Stomp" on Process of Elimination 7-inch compilation EP (Touch and Go)

=== Videos ===
- 2008 – The Devil's in the Details, Vol. 1 (MVD)
