= Magnetic Reference Laboratory =

Calibration tapes for professional analog audio tape machines

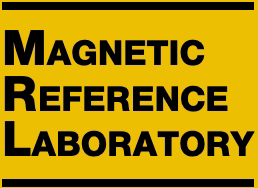
- Type: Private
- Industry: Audio calibration tapes
- Founded: 1972; 54 years ago
- Founder: John G. McKnight; Antonio Bardakos; Ed Seaman
- Headquarters: San Jose, California
- Area served: Worldwide
- Key people: Jeff McKnight (interim CEO)
- Number of employees: 3
- Website: mrltapes.com

Magnetic Reference Laboratory (MRL) is an American company founded in 1972. They produce and sell calibration tapes for analog audio magnetic tape reproducers in the open reel format. It was announced on 11 November 2023 that the company would cease business on 1 December 2023.

On December 7, 2023 MRL announced via their website that the company will in fact remain open, with "new offices, and new leadership, with MRL engineer Jeff McKnight taking on the role of Interim CEO."

== Origins ==
In 1972 (Jay) John G. McKnight was laid off from Ampex, as was (Tony) Antonio Bardakos, who was making the calibration tapes for Ampex at the time. Along with Ed Seaman (also an ex-Ampex employee), McKnight and Bardakos decided to start their own calibration tape business, and thus Magnetic Reference Lab (MRL) was born in 1972.

== Products ==
MRL makes a wide variety of calibration tapes (a tape that "contains test signals used to calibrate a tape reproducer so that it will conform to the accepted standards") that are sold world-wide. Examples of available test signals include:

- Multifrequency (general purpose, for setting reproducer gain, azimuth, and frequency response from 32 Hz to 20 kHz)
- Polarity Calibration
- Special signals for Sound Technology or for Audio Precision measurement systems
- Fast Swept-frequency for use with an oscilloscope
- Slow Swept-frequency for use with a plotter
- Single frequencies
- Broadband pink noise
- Broadband white noise
- Chromatic Sweep for use on a reproducer's VU meter

== Customers ==
MRL's calibration tapes are used by anyone who wants to have their analog audio magnetic tape reproducer properly calibrated, including:

- Professional music studios
- Radio stations
- Audio departments at major universities
- Theme parks
