= Terraform (Shellac album) =

1998 album by Shellac

Studio album by Shellac
- Released: May 19, 1998
- Recorded: 1995 – December 1996
- Genres: Indie rock, math rock, post-punk, noise rock
- Length: 36:22
- Label: Touch and Go
- Producer: Shellac

Shellac chronology
The Futurist (1997)	Terraform (1998)	1000 Hurts (2000)

Professional ratings
Review scores
Source	Rating
AllMusic	3/5 stars
The Encyclopedia of Popular Music	3/5 stars
The Great Alternative & Indie Discography	7/10
NME	5/10
OndaRock	8/10
Pitchfork	7.9/10
Rolling Stone	3.5/5 stars
The New Rolling Stone Album Guide	3/5 stars
Spin	7/10
Tiny Mix Tapes	5/5 marks

Terraform is the third studio album by American band Shellac, released in 1998.

== Track listing ==
No.	Title	Length
1.	"Didn't We Deserve a Look at You the Way You Really Are"	12:19
2.	"This Is a Picture"	2:30
3.	"Disgrace"	2:41
4.	"Mouthpiece"	4:44
5.	"Canada"	2:21
6.	"Rush Job"	2:17
7.	"House Full of Garbage"	7:36
8.	"Copper"	1:48

== Artwork ==
Credited to:

- Courtesy Estate of Chesley Bonestell
- Space Art Museum
- Smithsonian Institution

== Personnel ==
- Steve Albini – guitar/vocals
- Robert S. Weston IV – bass/vocals
- Todd Trainer – drums
