= Shellac (band) =

American rock band from Illinois, US

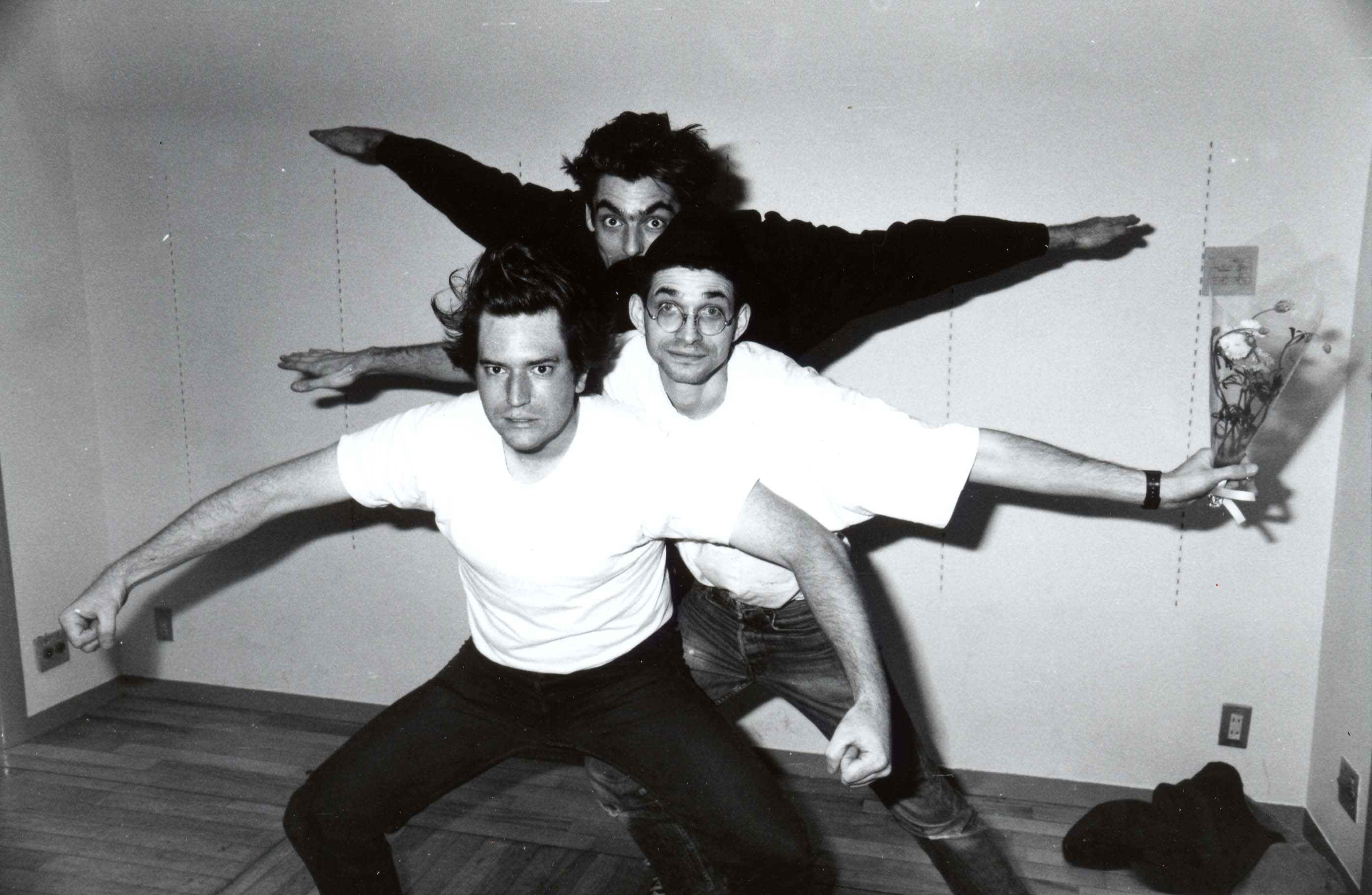
- Shellac in Shibuya, Japan, 1993. Front to back: Weston, Albini, Trainer

Background information
- Origin: Chicago, Illinois, U.S.
- Genres: Post-hardcore; noise rock; math rock
- Works: Shellac discography
- Years active: 1992–2024
- Labels: Touch and Go; Drag City; Skin Graft
- Past members: Steve Albini; Todd Trainer; Bob Weston
- Website: touchandgorecords.com/bands/band.php?id=22

Shellac was an American noise rock band from Chicago, Illinois, formed in 1992 by Steve Albini (guitar and vocals), Bob Weston (bass guitar and vocals) and Todd Trainer (drums and vocals). Their lineup remained consistent until Albini's death in May 2024.

They have been classified as post-hardcore and math rock, but described themselves as a "minimalist rock trio."

== Biography ==
Shellac formed in Chicago, Illinois, in 1992 as an informal collaboration between guitarist Steve Albini of noise rock trios Big Black and Rapeman, and drummer Todd Trainer from the band Breaking Circus and solo project Brick Layer Cake. Former Naked Raygun bassist Camilo Gonzalez sat in on early rehearsals and played on one song on Shellac's first single before Volcano Suns bassist Bob Weston joined as a permanent member. Both Weston and Albini were recording engineers. They preferred a sparse, analog recording sound with little or no overdubbing, and were meticulous about microphone placement and choice of equipment.

Shellac had a distinctive, minimalist sound based on asymmetric time signatures, repetitive rhythms, an angular guitar sound, and both Albini's and Weston's surreal, bitingly sarcastic lyrics. Songs typically do not have traditional verse/chorus/verse structure and the arrangements were sparse, to the point where some described them as "amelodic". Shellac's signature sound was often associated with their enthusiasm for vintage Travis Bean guitars, a rare brand of aluminium-necked instruments, and the Interfax "Harmonic Percolator" distortion pedal. Albini was known to use copper plectrums and typically wrapped his guitar strap around his waist rather than over his shoulder. The band preferred the intimacy of smaller clubs and live appearances were sporadic.

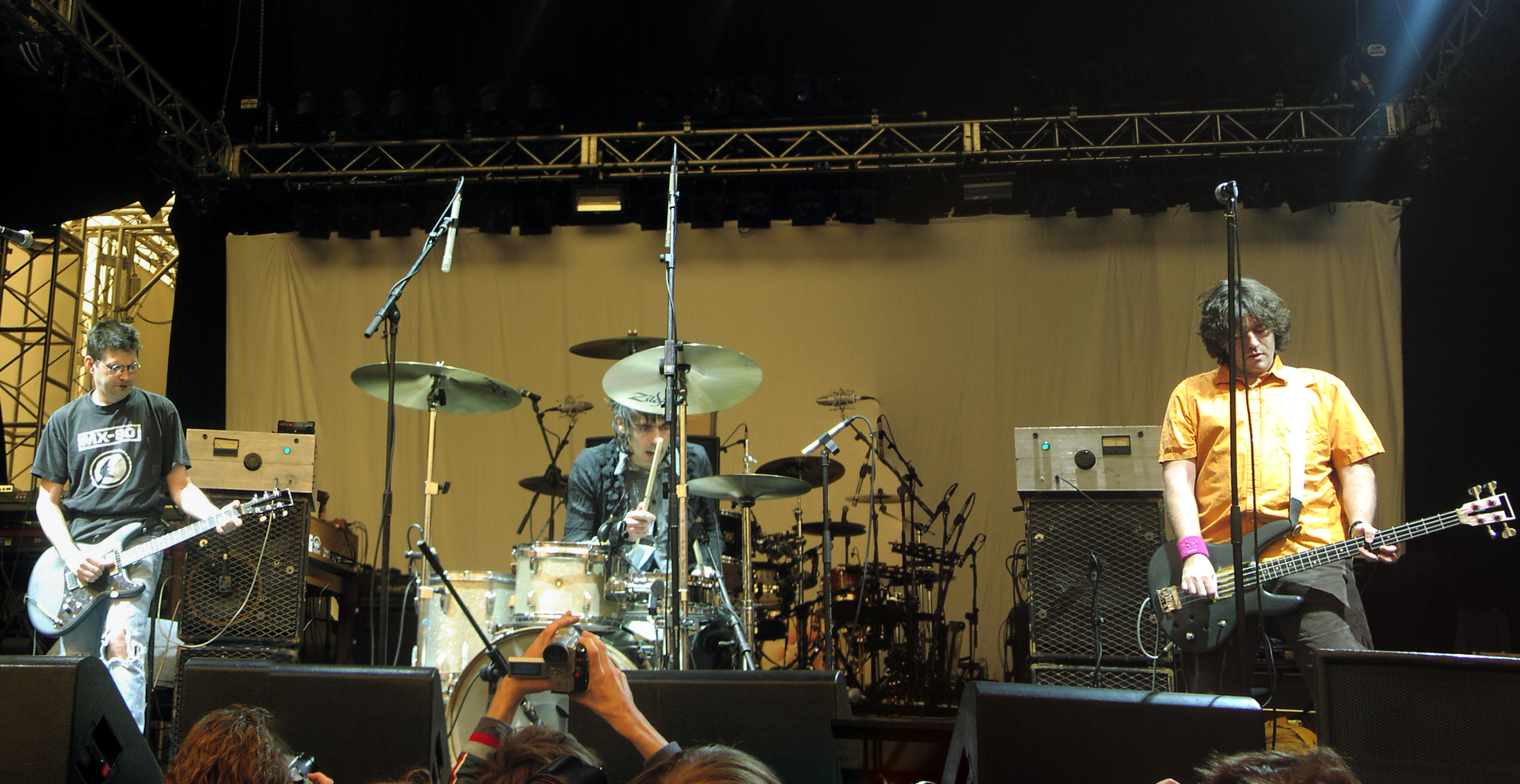
Shellac at All Tomorrow's Parties, 2007

Mid-set in many live performances, Shellac took the time for one or more "question and answer" sessions, where members of the band responded in an off-the-cuff and, at times, jocular manner to questions shouted out by fans and hecklers alike. The band made an early decision to not play at festivals, and this position was articulated to All Tomorrow's Parties (ATP) festival organizer Barry Hogan during the preparation stage of the inaugural ATP event. However, Scottish band Mogwai, curating the festival, convinced Albini to perform: "[ATP] completely changed the festival game. Now the whole world has to operate under the knowledge that there are these cool, curated festivals where everyone is treated well and the experience is a generally pleasant one." In 2002, the band curated the All Tomorrow's Parties festival in Camber Sands, England. Knowing that most of the audience had come specifically to see Shellac, the band went on first every morning as an incentive for the festival-goers to be up in time to see the other acts. A CD of tracks from the bands performing at the festival was released on ATP Records.

To celebrate their 20th anniversary as a band, Shellac returned to ATP to curate once more in December 2012 with the line-up including Wire, Scrawl, Mission Of Burma, the Ex + Brass Unbound, Red Fang, Shannon Wright, the Membranes, Alix, Bear Claw, Helen Money, Dead Rider, Arcwelder, Neurosis, Mono, Melt Banana, Uzeda, Prinzhorn Dance School, Three Second Kiss, Buke and Gase, Oxbow, Nina Nastasia, Zeni Geva, Bottomless Pit, Pinebender, STNNNG and more.

Touch and Go Records released the bulk of Shellac’s material, starting with a couple of singles in 1993 and the band’s debut album At Action Park in 1994. Because of Albini and Weston’s full-time careers as audio engineers, Shellac would record their music gradually over the following decades, releasing the albums Terraform in 1998, 1000 Hurts in 2000, and Excellent Italian Greyhound in 2007. In 2014, despite the considerable downsizing that Touch and Go had undergone, the band's fifth LP, Dude Incredible, was released. Steve Albini went over each song on the album with Exclaim magazine.

A collection of the band's two Peel Sessions from 1994 and 2004, entitled The End of Radio was released on June 14, 2019.

On March 20, 2024, the band announced a new record called To All Trains, to be released on May 17 via Touch and Go Records. On May 7, 2024, Albini died of a heart attack in his Chicago home, ten days before the scheduled release of To All Trains.

== Legacy ==
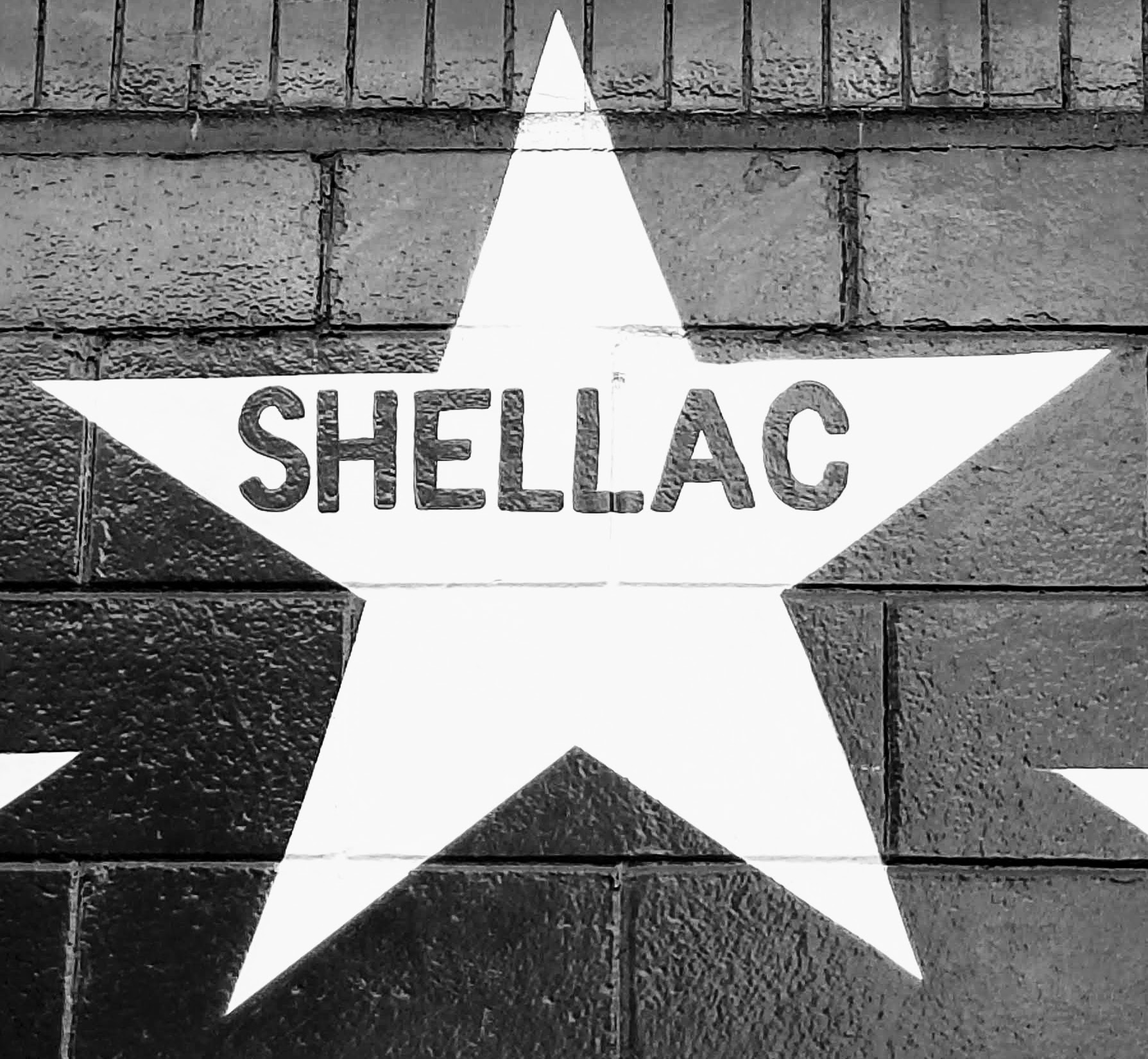
Star honoring Shellac on the outside mural of the Minneapolis nightclub First Avenue

Writing for Drowned in Sound, Benjamin Bland said that, "Big Black and Shellac are surely the two most influential 'noise rock' groups there have ever been. Hundreds of bands have sounded like them, and in all probability so will hundreds more. Who can blame them? When a shadow that large looms over an entire subgenre of music, it’s hard not to be influenced by it, let alone ignore it altogether."

John Robb, music critic and frontman of British post-punk band the Membranes, called Shellac "the finest rock band on the planet. This is the rock band that the rest of us in our bands [...] have had to measure ourselves against and if we are found wanting then we have to cower behind rocks and attempt to revive our measly offerings until they measure up." Vish Khanna expanded on their influence, noting that "[t]he band's sense of empathy, great storytelling, interpersonal politics and black humour are not necessarily uncommon in post-punk noise-rock bands, but Shellac's path is likely the most distinctive and emulated one."

Christian Lembach of Whores called At Action Park his favorite noise rock album of all time. Mike Sullivan of Russian Circles cited the album as a major influence on his guitar-playing, noting that it "literally changed the way [he] looked at music". The band has also been cited as an influence by Mclusky (who have been described with the moniker "Poundland Shellac"), Kurt Ballou of Converge, Mono, Swing Kids, Karin Dreijer of The Knife, Gilla Band, Black Country, New Road, Jehnny Beth of Savages, Silverchair, My Disco, Gengahr, Dredg, Suicide Dolls, Echo Is Your Love, The Futureheads, KEN Mode, and Pile.

Shellac was honored with a star on the outside mural of the Minneapolis nightclub First Avenue, recognizing performers that have played sold-out shows or have otherwise demonstrated a major contribution to the culture at the iconic venue. Receiving a star "might be the most prestigious public honor an artist can receive in Minneapolis," according to journalist Steve Marsh.

Shellac were recognized as the "House Band" of the All Tomorrow's Parties (now defunct) and Primavera Sound festivals, which Albini saw as the exceptions to his general distaste of music festivals for exploiting the underground music scene. In Albini's lifetime, Shellac performed at every edition of Primavera Sound since 2006, except for 2007. In 2018, the festival sold a shirt that read "Shellac and 249 More" in reference to its lineup. Following Albini's death, the festival said in a statement honoring him, "What are we going to do without you, Steve? After having welcomed them at 15 editions of the festival, it is impossible for us to imagine a Primavera Sound without him, because no band explains us better than Shellac." During the 2024 edition of Primavera Sound, there was a listening party of To All Trains during Shellac's planned time slot which served as a memorial to Albini, and the festival renamed a stage for him in his honor.

== Discography ==
- At Action Park (1994)
- The Futurist (1997)
- Terraform (1998)
- 1000 Hurts (2000)
- Excellent Italian Greyhound (2007)
- Dude Incredible (2014)
- To All Trains (2024)
