= Detroit Rock City (book) =

Book by Steve Miller

Detroit Rock City: The Uncensored History of Rock 'n' Roll in America's Loudest City
- First edition
- Author: Steve Miller
- Language: English
- Subject: Rock and Roll
- Genre: Music
- Publisher: Da Capo Press
- Publication date: June 25, 2013
- Publication place: United States
- Pages: 312
- ISBN: 978-0306820656
- Dewey Decimal: 781.660977434
- LC Class: ML3534.3 .M59

Detroit Rock City: The Uncensored History of Rock 'n' Roll in America's Loudest City is a book by Steve Miller, a Michigan-based journalist. It chronicles Detroit bands from 1967 to the 2000s. The book's narrative is told through verbatim quotes. It was released on June 25, 2013, by Da Capo Press.

== About the book ==
The 336-page book, which reached #5 on Amazon.com in the rock and roll Bestsellers category, is an oral history of Detroit rock and roll. It offers quotes from the rock stars, club promoters, fans, producers and others involved in the scenes. It chronicles the careers of '60s and '70s icons like Iggy & The Stooges, Bob Seger, Alice Cooper and The MC5, but also tells of The Romantics, Negative Approach, Insane Clown Posse and The White Stripes. On July 17, 2013, White's Third Man Records in Nashville hosted a book-signing and discussion with the book's author Steve Miller and a panel of Detroit music insiders.

The book features new interviews with guitar legends Ted Nugent, Dick Wagner (of The Frost) and James Williamson of The Stooges, among others. There is also exclusive interviews with Jack White, Suzi Quatro and Andrew W.K.

It tells of the psychedelic Grande Ballroom days and the Eastown Theater - where national superstar bands shared the stage with local acts. Other venues included are Michigan Palace, Bookies Club 870, City Club, Gold Dollar, and Magic Stick – all popular venues in the Detroit area.

== Reviews ==
To date, the book has received a largely positive response from critics, including favorable reviews from glossy rock magazine like Uncut Magazine and Mojo Magazine, among others. The Wall Street Journal critic David Kirby had this to say in a July 5, 2013 review: "We get a picture of a dysfunctional Detroit scene that, like a negative image, shows what is needed to make great, lasting art by depicting its opposite. That makes the book worth reading, if in a perverse way.

On July 24, 2013 The Boston Globe posted a review saying, "This book is not for the squeamish. But if you truly love rock 'n' roll, you'll enjoy the ride."

The Hollywood Reporter wrote this on July 23, 2013: "A punk rock overlap with "Please Kill Me" provides some of the book's most arresting passages with Motor City figureheads like Sinclair, The MC5's Wayne Kramer and head Stooge Iggy Pop, who poses front and center on the book's cover, providing insights, contexts and entertaining asides." The review goes on to say that "the story bogs down" at points, and notes that the book ignores black artists, including "the Motown legends".

On June 21, 2013 The Austin Chronicle's Kevin Curtin commended the flow of the book: "With its scriptlike format, Detroit Rock City … makes you feel like you were in the scrum", but pointed out the book "didn't draw any over-arching conclusions".

Record Collector reviewer Joel McIver, in the June 2013 issue, wrote this: "This book is for anyone who thinks that New York, Los Angeles and possibly Nashville are America's only musical capitals. After reading Detroit Rock City, you'll be convinced that Michigan's automotive metropolis has always outdone any other US hub ... Great job, Miller."
