= Tesco Vee =

American singer

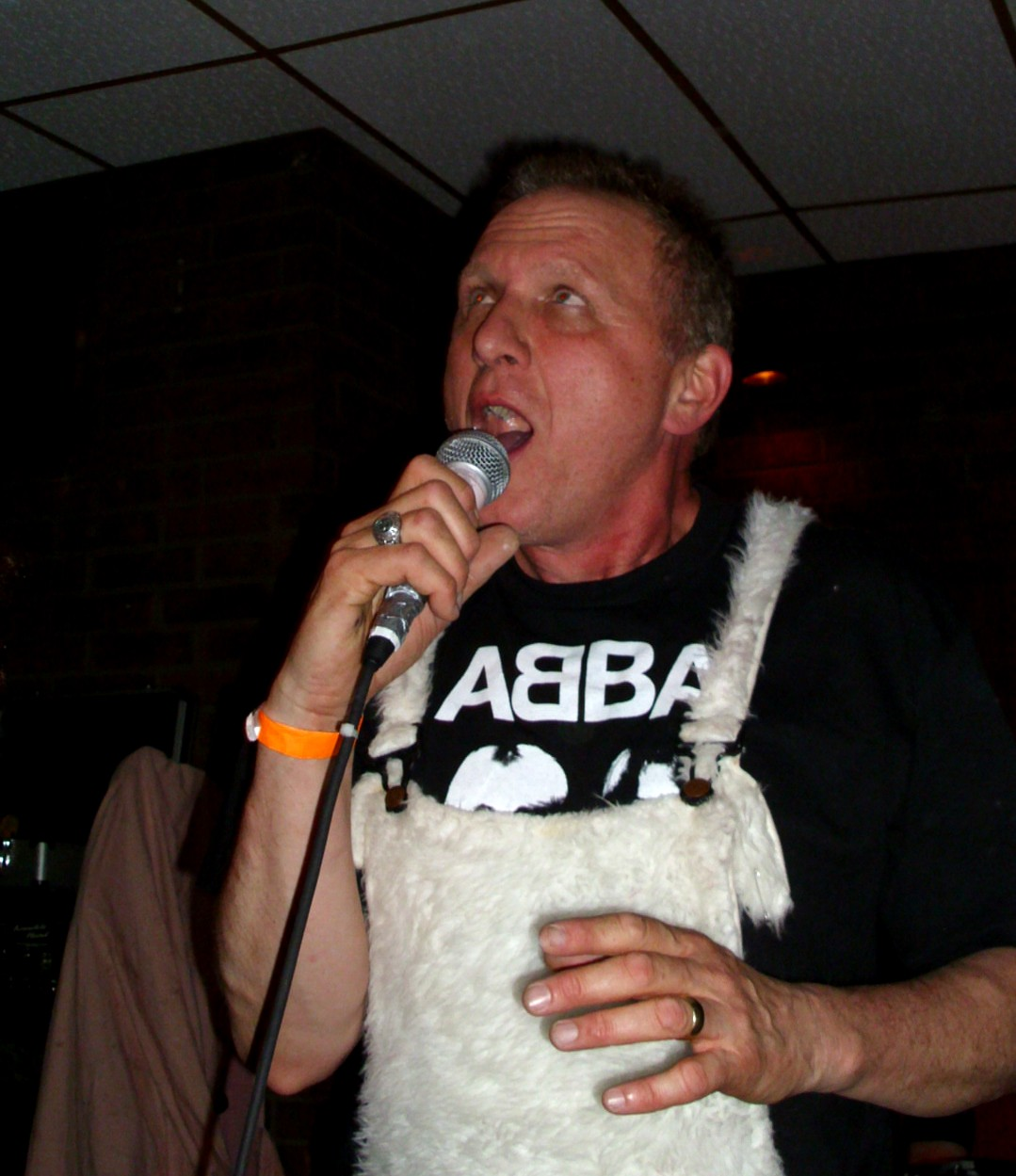

Background information
- Born: Robert Vermeulen; August 26, 1955 (age 70); Kalamazoo, Michigan, United States
- Genres: Punk rock, hardcore punk, heavy metal
- Occupation: 5th grade school teacher
- Instrument: Vocalist
- Years active: 1980–present
- Label: Touch and Go Records
- Member of: The Meatmen

Tesco Vee (born Robert Vermeulen; August 26, 1955) is an American, Michigan-based punk rock musician, and co-founder of Touch and Go Records zine. Born in Kalamazoo, Michigan, he is a former elementary school teacher and the founding member, and front man, of punk bands The Meatmen, Tesco Vee's Hate Police, Blight, and Dutch Hercules.

== History ==
In 1979, while working as a third- and fifth-grade teacher in Williamston, Michigan, Tesco Vee and his friend Dave Stimson self-wrote and self-printed Touch and Go, a Lansing-based zine, and one of the pioneering punk and hardcore punk zines. It featured politically incorrect, and often crude humor, alongside album and single reviews of Black Flag, Minor Threat and Bad Brains.

In 1981, Touch and Go also became a small label, releasing vinyl singles by The Necros, Meatmen and Negative Approach. The Touch and Go zine folded after 22 issues, the label having released a few limited-release 7” hardcore punk records. The label was then taken over by Necros bassist Corey Rusk, who moved the label to Chicago and grew it into an international success, signing bands such as Big Black, Butthole Surfers, The Jesus Lizard, and TV on the Radio. Rusk continued operations of the label until 2008.

After handing Touch and Go over to Rusk in 1983, Tesco moved to Washington, DC, and began to focus on his own punk band, The Meatmen, who played shows until 1996 along with related projects recorded as a solo artist and under the name Tesco Vee’s Hate Police. In 1999, Tesco and his family moved back to the Lansing, Michigan, area. In 2007, Tesco began playing Meatmen shows again with a new lineup of Michigan musicians.

In 2010, Tesco Vee reformed Tesco Vee's Hate Police and eventually recast and toured with The Meatmen. He also published Touch and Go: The Complete Hardcore Punk Zine '79-'83", an anthology chronicling all 22 issues of the Touch and Go zine as a single trade paperback book. In 2014, he collaborated with Blowfly on his album Black in the Sack.

In 2022 Tesco Vee opened a vintage toy shop in Lansing, Michigan where he sells parts of his extensive collection of toys from the 1940s to the 1980s. The collection includes puppets, coloring books, plastic figurines, character dolls and model kits.
