= The Futurist (Shellac album) =

1997 album by Shellac

Studio album by Shellac
- Released: 1997
- Recorded: 1995
- Genre: Post-hardcore; post-rock; experimental rock; noise rock
- Length: 27:45
- Label: self-released
- Producer: Steve Albini

Shellac chronology
At Action Park (1994)	The Futurist (1997)	Terraform (1998)

Professional ratings
Review scores
Source	Rating
Allmusic	3/5 stars

The Futurist is the second studio album issued by the American band Shellac. The album, of which only 779 original copies were created, was issued exclusively to friends of the band. The album was originally used as music for a performance by La La La Human Steps.

== Friends Only ==
The cover of the album contains 779 names—one for each copy of the album. At the bottom of the cover is a blank space for anyone not named on the cover to write their name. Each person who received the album got a copy with their name circled on the cover; this was done for identification of a "culprit" should the album ever end up for sale.

The Futurist was never released commercially. There is speculation that this was because Shellac were not satisfied with the finished product. A year later, Shellac released their second commercial full-length, Terraform.

== Movements ==
The music on The Futurist is divided into ten total movements. Versions have floated around on file-sharing communities which have divided the album into five movements, and into two sides (vinyl sides A and B—Shellac are notorious vinyl purists, and The Futurist was only issued on LP).

== Reception ==
Andy Kellman of Allmusic gave the album a mixed review, citing its overtly experimental nature. "Rather than proper tracks or songs," he writes, "the record seems to have ten "movements," as each piece flows steadily into the next. Oscillator tweakings mixed with Morse code transmissions and overseas correspondence give way to brief guitar/bass/drum bursts. Skronking noise here, guitar twists there, and familiar band interplay every now and again à la "QRJ" (off 1000 Hurts) double Dutch with each other, never outlasting their welcome." He is, however, more favorable in viewing the second half and cites the "bombastic" final movement as "the high point of the record". He concludes by writing: "It might be second-rate Shellac, but second-rate Shellac is just fine."
