= Necros =

American hardcore punk band

- Origin: Maumee, Ohio
- Genres: Hardcore punk, post-hardcore
- Years active: 1978–1987
- Labels: Touch and Go, Dischord, Gasatanka, Restless. Enigma, Rykodisc
- Past members: Barry Henssler; Andy Wendler; Todd Swalla; Corey Rusk; Brian Pollack; David Cooke; Brian Hyland; Jeff Lake; Ron Sakowski

Necros was an early American hardcore punk band from Maumee, Ohio, although they are usually identified with the Detroit music scene. They were the first band to record for Touch and Go Records.

== History ==
Necros was formed in mid-1979 by then-teenagers Barry Henssler (vocals), Andy Wendler (guitar), and Todd Swalla (drums). After going through a handful of bassists (including Donny Brook, Jeff Allsop, David Cooke, Brian Hyland, Jeff Lake, and Brian Pollack), Corey Rusk joined the band. Barry Henssler had struck up a friendship with Tesco Vee and Dave Stimson of Touch and Go magazine after sending them a copy of his own 'zine, Smegma Journal. Vee and Stimson became fans and put out the band's first record, a self-titled 4-song 7-inch EP (recorded prior to Rusk joining) most commonly known as "Sex Drive". This was Touch and Go Records' (then spelled "Rekords") first release and was limited to only 100 copies.

Andy Wendler left the band in 1981 (although he continued to write for them) and Brian Pollack joined on guitar. Later that year, the band recorded and released another self-titled 7-inch record known as "IQ32", produced by Minor Threat vocalist Ian MacKaye. This nine-song effort was jointly released by Touch and Go (which Rusk now had a hand in running) and MacKaye's own Dischord Records. Wendler rejoined on guitar in late 1982 and, in 1983, the band recorded and released two more records, a 7-inch and LP both titled Conquest For Death.

Early on, Necros played with many prominent punk bands, including Black Flag, Bad Brains, Sonic Youth, Minor Threat, and Tesco Vee's group The Meatmen. Necros also toured as openers for horror punk band the Misfits, including at the Misfits' last show in which Todd Swalla stepped in to play drums when Misfits drummer Brian Damage became too drunk to perform.

In 1983, Corey Rusk quit the group to concentrate on Touch and Go, after assuming full control of the label and bassist Ron Sakowski stepped in. Despite the group's steady output at their onset, the band did not release another record for two years. In an interview with One Solution zine, vocalist Barry Henssler blamed the delay between releases on Rusk's refusal to give the band a definite answer as to whether or not they were still on Touch and Go. The label has since deleted their Necros releases from their catalogue.

The next Necros release came in 1985 as a split LP with White Flag entitled Jail Jello, on Gasatanka Records. Now featuring a more distinctly post-hardcore sound, the band followed up the split with 1986's Tangled Up LP on Restless Records, along with a single of the same name on Gasatanka. After spending 1987 touring, first with Megadeth and then later the Circle Jerks, the group called it quits. A live album, Live or Else, appeared posthumously in 1989.

== Post break up ==
Barry Henssler went on to form the band Big Chief, who recorded for the Sub Pop label. Ron Sakowski and Todd Swalla reunited in the mid 1990s as part of the final line up of Touch and Go artists Laughing Hyenas. Andy Wendler played in a group called Gone In Sixty Seconds (also known as G.I.S.S.).

In 2002, a limited (only 450 copies pressed) split 10-inch with Authority Abuse was released by Wise Hoodlum Records featuring live Necros recordings from 1981–1983. The band's first demo was reissued as the "Ambionic Sound" 7-inch in 2012, named for the studio where it was recorded.

In 2005 Rykodisc reissued Tangled Up and Live or Else together on one CD, currently the only Necros material available on CD.

Ron Sakowski plays bass in Negative Approach, a hardcore punk band from the same scene as Necros, since their reunion in 2006.

== Former members ==
- Barry Henssler - vocals (1979-1987)
- Todd Swalla - drums (1979-1987)
- Andy Wendler - guitar (1979-1981; 1982-1987)
- David Cooke - bass (1979)
- Brian Hyland - bass (1979-1980)
- Jeff Lake - bass (1980)
- Brian Pollack - bass (1980-1981); guitar (1981-1982)
- Corey Rusk - bass (1981-1983)
- Ron Sakowski - bass (1983-1987)

== Discography ==
=== Studio albums ===
- Conquest for Death (1983, Touch and Go)
- Tangled Up (1987, Restless)

=== EPs and singles ===
- Sex Drive 7-inch (1981, Touch and Go)
- IQ32 7-inch (1981, Touch and Go)
- Conquest for Death 7-inch (1983, Touch and Go)
- Jail Jello split 12-inch with White Flag (1985, Gasatanka)
- Tangled Up 7-inch (1985, Gasatanka)
- Necros/Authority Abuse split 10-inch (2002, Wise Hoodlum)
- Ambionic Sound 7-inch (2012, Alona' Dream)
- Club House Session 7-inch (2013, Alona' Dream)

=== Compilation and live albums ===
- Rat Music For Rat People Vol. II compilation album (1984, CD Presents, LTD.)
- Live or Else (1990, Medusa)
- Tangled Up/Live or Else compilation album (2005, Rykodisc)
- Live in '85 live album (2014, Jett Plastic Recordings)

=== Compilation appearances ===
- "Bad Dream" on Process of Elimination 7-inch compilation EP (1981, Touch and Go)
