= Todd Trainer =

American drummer

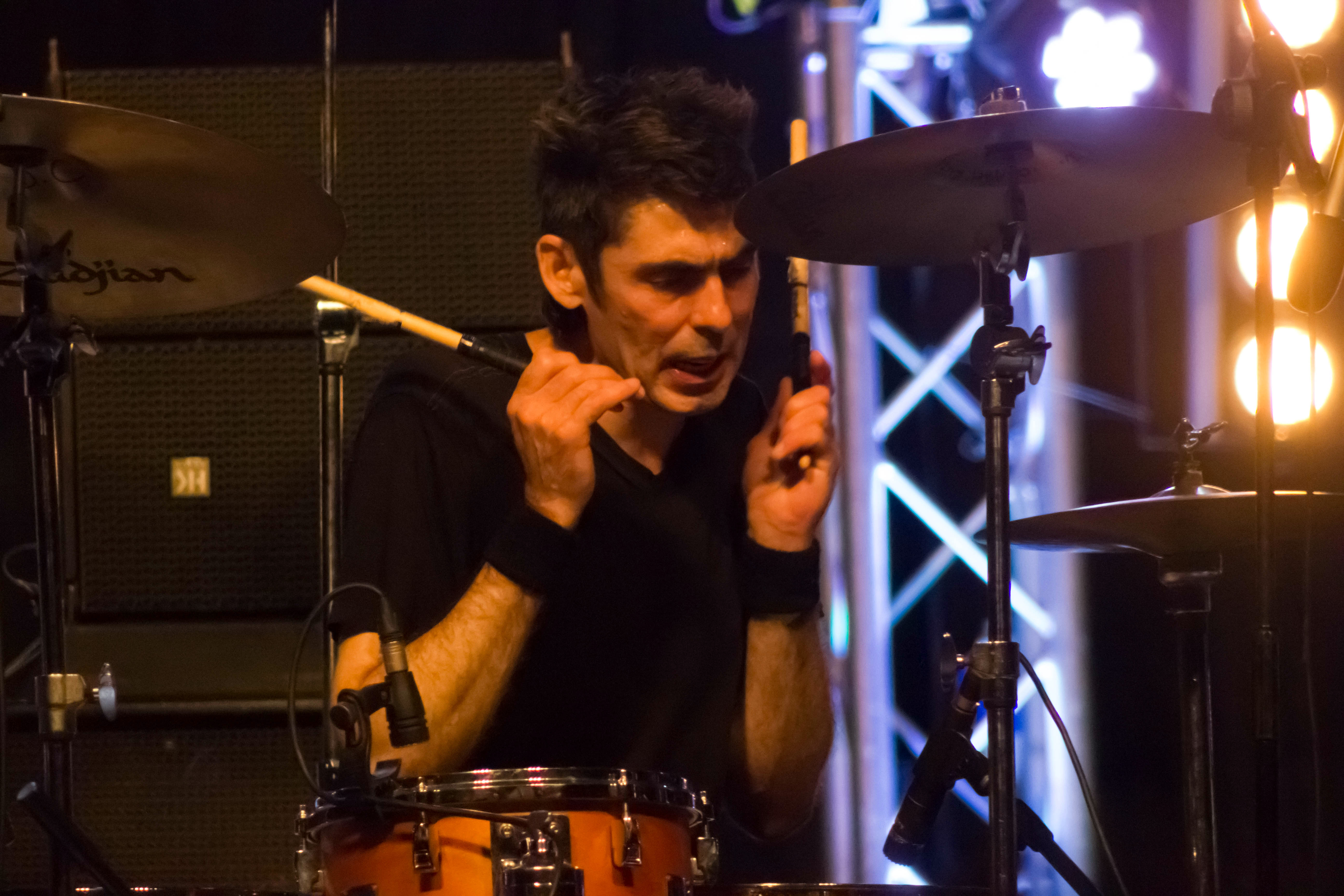
- Trainer in 2015

Background information
- Also known as: Brick Layer Cake
- Origin: Minneapolis, Minnesota, US
- Genres: Post-punk, noise rock, post-hardcore
- Instrument: Drums
- Formerly of: Breaking Circus, Rifle Sport, Shellac

Todd Stanford Trainer is an American musician who was the drummer for the band Shellac. He also performs as a solo artist under the name Brick Layer Cake. He previously played drums for the bands Breaking Circus and Rifle Sport, and he played drums with Scout Niblett in 2005.

== Personal life ==
Trainer resides in Minneapolis, Minnesota and maintains close ties to his parents and sister Terri. His Italian Greyhound Uffizi inspired the title of Shellac's fourth studio album Excellent Italian Greyhound. He and his dog, along with his band Shellac, were featured in an episode of Dogs 101 in 2009 centered on Italian Greyhounds.

== Drumming style ==
"Dog and Pony Show" (1994)
"Dog and Pony Show" by Shellac showcases the "primal" aesthetic of Trainer's drumming

Critics generally have favored Trainer's primitive approach to rock drumming. A review in The New York Times of a 2001 Shellac performance described the "stubborn crack and thud of Todd Trainer's drums", and critic Brent DiCrescenzo wrote that "Trainer beats his drums so primally, you'd swear he's only wearing a loincloth." A review in Spin of the Shellac album Terraform declared that Trainer "gracefully resurrects the lost art of the [John] Bonham stomp".

== Brick Layer Cake ==
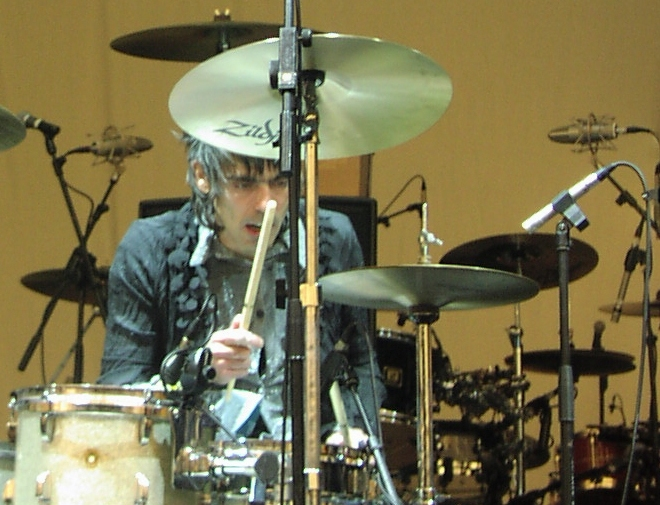
Trainer performing with Shellac in 2007

Brick Layer Cake is the solo project of Todd Trainer, who plays every instrument and sings in a deep, spoken word monotone. The music of Brick Layer Cake features very slow tempos and "drone-like" compositions, which Steve Albini described as follows: “Think of Nick Drake on downers fronting Black Sabbath, if Black Sabbath played only the good parts of their songs."

=== Discography ===
- Eye for an Eye - Tooth for a Tooth (Ruthless Records) 1990
- Call It A Day (Touch and Go Records) 1991
- Tragedy Tragedy (Touch and Go Records) 1994
- Whatchamacallit (Touch and Go Records) 2002
