= Touch and Go Records =

American independent record label

- Founded: 1981
- Founder: Tesco Vee; Dave Stimson; Corey Rusk
- Distributors: ADA; Carrot Top; Electric Fetus; Revolver USA; FAB, De Konkurrent; AEC; PIAS; Love Da Records; Inertia
- Genre: Punk rock; hardcore punk; indie rock; noise rock; alternative rock; experimental; math rock
- Country of origin: United States
- Location: Chicago, Illinois
- Official website: touchandgorecords.com

Touch and Go Records is an American independent record label located in Chicago, Illinois. After its genesis as a handmade fanzine in 1979, it grew into one of the key record labels in the American 1980s underground and alternative rock scenes. Touch and Go carved out a reputation for releasing adventurous noise rock by the likes of Big Black, the Butthole Surfers, and The Jesus Lizard. Touch and Go helped to spearhead the nationwide network of underground bands that formed the pre-Nirvana indie rock scene, and helped preside over the shift from the hardcore punk that then dominated the American underground scene to the more diverse styles of alternative rock emerging at the time.

== History ==
Touch and Go began in 1979 as a self-printed fanzine in East Lansing, Michigan written and published by Tesco Vee and Dave Stimson. It wasn't until 1981 that it grew into an independent record label. Vee (later front man of The Meatmen) was bored with the punk sounds of the day, and captivated by the emerging hardcore movement in America. Inspired, he put out records by the Necros, The Fix, The Meatmen, and Negative Approach. In 1981, Necros bassist Corey Rusk joined with Tesco to run the label. In 1983, Tesco handed Touch and Go over to Rusk and his wife Lisa when he left Michigan for Washington, D.C. With the label under their ownership, the Rusks hired Terry Tolkin who signed the Butthole Surfers and Virgin Prunes to the label, and also produced the Gods Favorite Dog compilation. Soon the Rusks relocated the label to Chicago, and Touch and Go released material in the mid-'80s to mid-'90s by bands such as the Butthole Surfers, Big Black, the Jesus Lizard, Scratch Acid, the Didjits, Slint, Girls Against Boys and Killdozer, and continued into the new millennium with artists on its roster including Shellac, Yeah Yeah Yeahs, TV on the Radio, Arcwelder, CocoRosie, Ted Leo and the Pharmacists, and the Black Heart Procession. Lisa Rusk left the label after she and Corey divorced. Corey Rusk continues to run the label.

Touch and Go's "sister label," Quarterstick Records, was formed in 1990. Rusk started the label to release music he felt didn't fit into Touch and Go's identity as a rock label. He was also going through a divorce from Touch and Go's co-owner Lisa at the time, and wanted a label that was uninvolved with that. By starting with a clean slate, Rusk felt freer to release a more eclectic range of genres that reflected his broader musical tastes. Early Quarterstick releases included pop-punk band Pegboy, classical artist Rachel's, bluegrass band Bad Livers, and spoken word artist Henry Rollins.

Similarly to some other alternative music labels, Touch and Go pursued a relaxed approach to recording contracts, characterized sometimes by handshake deals providing for a 50–50 split of profits between artist and label after promotion and production costs. In this way, the label built a respected catalog of influential punk and alternative artists, who in turn, appreciated the commitment of Touch and Go.

On February 18, 2009, Corey Rusk announced that Touch and Go would downsize itself. He cited the "current state of the economy" as the reason for shutting down manufacturing and distribution services.

Since 2009, Touch and Go has specialized in releasing limited editions of releases from its bands and other associated acts, like the remastered 30th anniversary of Slint's Spiderland, but has also released new material, like Shellac's To All Trains.

== Roster ==
- !!!
- All the Saints
- Angry Red Planet
- Arcwelder
- Arsenal
- Bedhead (reissued back catalog)
- Big Black
- Big Boys (reissued back catalog compilation)
- Blight
- The Black Heart Procession
- Blonde Redhead
- Brainiac
- Brick Layer Cake
- Butthole Surfers
- Calexico
- Cargo Cult
- Cash Audio
- Chrome (reissued back catalog)
- CocoRosie
- Crystal Antlers
- Daddy Longhead
- The Delta 72
- Didjits
- Die Kreuzen
- Dirty Three
- Don Caballero
- The Effigies
- Enon
- The Ex
- The Fix
- Flour
- The For Carnation
- Girls Against Boys
- Hose (God's Favorite Dog compilation)
- The Jesus Lizard
- Killdozer
- L-Seven
- Laughing Hyenas
- Lee Harvey Oswald Band
- Low (split single with The Dirty Three)
- Man or Astro-man?
- Monorchid
- Naked Raygun (reissued back catalog)
- Necros
- Negative Approach
- The New Year
- New Wet Kojak
- Nina Nastasia
- Nirvana (split single with The Jesus Lizard)
- No Trend
- Phono-Comb
- P. W. Long
- Pinback
- Polvo
- Quasi
- Rachel's
- Rapeman
- Red Stars Theory
- Rodan
- The Rollins Band
- Scratch Acid
- Seam
- Shannon Wright
- Shellac
- Silkworm
- Silverfish
- Skull Kontrol
- Slint
- The Standard
- Storm & Stress
- Supersystem
- Tar
- Ted Leo and the Pharmacists
- Three Mile Pilot
- Sally Timms
- TV on the Radio
- Urge Overkill
- Uzeda
- Violent Apathy
- Virgin Prunes
- Wuhling
- Yeah Yeah Yeahs

=== Quarterstick Records artists ===
- Bad Livers
- Calexico
- DK3
- Dead Child
- June of 44
- Kepone
- The Mekons
- Mi Ami
- Peter Móren (of Peter, Bjorn and John)
- Mule
- Naked Raygun
- Tara Jane O'Neil
- Pegboy
- Phono-Comb
- Rachel's
- Rodan
- Henry Rollins
- Shipping News
- Sholi
- The Sonora Pine
- Therapy?
- The Uglysuit
- Volcano Suns
- Shannon Wright

== See also ==
- List of record labels
- Chicago Record Labels

== Other sources ==
- Tupica, Rich: Touch and Go zine feature in City Pulse. July 2010. accessed July 10, 2010
