= Matchbox Twenty discography =

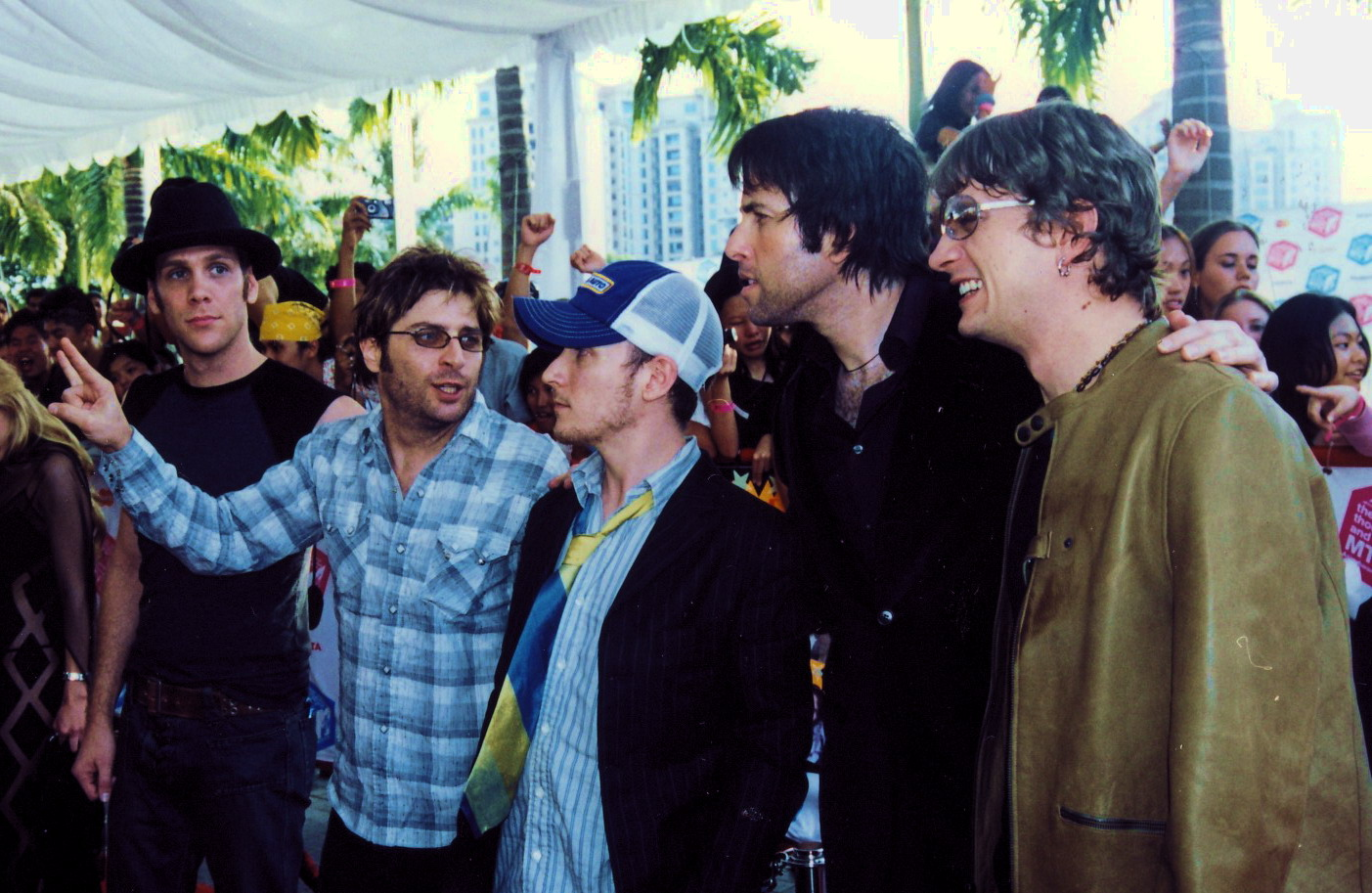
- Matchbox Twenty at the 2003 MTV Asia Awards
- Studio albums: 5
- Extended plays: 4
- Compilation albums: 1
- Singles: 25
- Promotional singles: 6
- Video albums: 3
- Music videos: 19
- Box sets: 1

American rock band Matchbox Twenty has released five studio albums, one compilation album, one box set, three video albums, four extended plays, 25 singles, six promotional singles and 19 music videos. The band released their debut studio album, Yourself or Someone Like You, in October 1996. The album's lead single "Long Day" was moderately successful, while the album's second single "Push" received large amounts of airplay in the United States. As it was not released for commercial sale, "Push" was deemed ineligible by American chart provider Billboard to appear on its main Hot 100 singles chart. It did, however, peak at number five on the Billboard Hot 100 Airplay chart and became a top-ten hit in countries such as Australia and Canada. With the success of "Push" and follow-up singles "3AM", "Real World" and "Back 2 Good", Yourself or Someone Like You eventually peaked at number five on the US Billboard 200 and was certified twelve-times platinum by the Recording Industry Association of America (RIAA).

Following the success of their debut album, Matchbox Twenty released their second studio album, Mad Season, in May 2000. The album was a commercial success, peaking at number three on the Billboard 200 and at number one in Australia. The album's lead single, "Bent", became the band's first number-one hit on the Billboard Hot 100. "If You're Gone", the album's second single, peaked at number five on the Hot 100. Mad Season spawned two more singles: "Mad Season", and "Last Beautiful Girl". More Than You Think You Are, the band's third studio album, was released in November 2002 and peaked at number six on the Billboard 200, earning a double platinum certification from the RIAA. "Unwell", the album's second single, peaked at number five on the Hot 100. The extended play EP was released in November 2003, peaking at number forty-three on the Billboard 200. The video album Show: A Night in the Life of Matchbox Twenty was released in May 2004, topping the Billboard Top Video Albums chart.

Following a hiatus to allow lead singer Rob Thomas to focus on his solo career, Matchbox Twenty reunited to record six new songs for a compilation album. The resulting album, Exile on Mainstream, was released in October 2007; it peaked at number three on the Billboard 200. The album's lead single, "How Far We've Come", peaked at number 11 on the Hot 100 and was certified platinum by the RIAA; it became a top-ten hit in Australia and Canada. "All Your Reasons", the album's second single, became a top-forty hit in Australia. North, the band's fourth studio album, was released in September 2012 and became their first album to top the Billboard 200. North was preceded by the release of its lead single, "She's So Mean", which peaked at number 40 on the Hot 100.

== Albums ==
=== Studio albums ===
List of studio albums, with selected chart positions, sales figures and certifications
Title	Details	Peak chart positions										Sales	Certifications
Title	Details	US	AUS	CAN	GER	IRL	NLD	NZ	SWE	SWI	UK	Sales	Certifications
Yourself or Someone Like You	Released: October 1, 1996; Label: Atlantic; Formats: CD, LP, cassette, digital download, streaming	5	1	11	21	38	50	3	—	46	50	US: 12,000,000; AUS: 710,000	RIAA: 12× Platinum; ARIA: Diamond; BPI: Gold; MC: 8× Platinum; RMNZ: 5× Platinum
Mad Season	Released: May 23, 2000; Label: Atlantic; Formats: CD, LP, cassette, digital download, streaming	3	1	3	11	19	60	7	44	57	31	US: 4,000,000	RIAA: 4× Platinum; ARIA: 4× Platinum; BPI: Gold; MC: 3× Platinum; RMNZ: Gold
More Than You Think You Are	Released: November 19, 2002; Label: Atlantic; Formats: CD, LP, cassette, digital download, streaming	6	3	10	11	15	71	6	36	61	31	US: 1,400,000	RIAA: 2× Platinum; ARIA: 5× Platinum; BPI: Silver; MC: Platinum; RMNZ: Gold
North	Released: September 4, 2012; Label: Atlantic; Formats: CD, LP, digital download, streaming	1	1	2	13	19	45	6	—	25	14	US: 500,000	RIAA: Gold; ARIA: Platinum
Where the Light Goes	Released: May 26, 2023; Label: Atlantic; Formats: CD, LP, digital download, streaming	53	2	—	77	—	—	26	—	79	—		
"—" denotes a recording that did not chart or was not released in that territory.

=== Compilation albums ===
List of compilation albums, with selected chart positions, sales figures and certifications
Title	Details	Peak chart positions										Sales	Certifications
Title	Details	US	US Alt.	AUS	CAN	GER	IRL	NLD	NZ	SWI	UK	Sales	Certifications
Exile on Mainstream	Released: October 2, 2007; Label: Atlantic; Formats: CD, LP, cassette, digital download, streaming	3	1	1	8	28	9	98	2	46	53	US: 827,000	RIAA: Gold; ARIA: 3× Platinum; BPI: Silver; MC: Gold; RMNZ: 2× Platinum

=== Box sets ===
List of box sets, with selected chart positions
Title	Details	Peak chart positions
Title	Details	AUS
20	Released: February 2022; Label: Atlantic; Format: 7x LP; limited to 5,000 copies	70

=== Video albums ===
List of video albums, with selected chart positions and certifications
Title	Details	Peak chart positions		Certifications
Title	Details	US Video	AUS DVD	Certifications
Live from Australia	Released: June 8, 1999; Label: Atlantic; Formats: VHS	20	—	
VH1 Storytellers	Released: May 7, 2002; Label: Atlantic; Formats: DVD	11	13	ARIA: Platinum
Show: A Night in the Life of Matchbox Twenty	Released: May 25, 2004; Label: Atlantic; Formats: DVD	1	1	RIAA: Platinum; ARIA: 2× Platinum
"—" denotes a recording that did not chart or was not released in that territory.

== Extended plays ==
List of extended plays, with selected chart positions
Title	Details	Peak chart positions
Title	Details	US
EP	Released: November 11, 2003; Label: Atlantic; Formats: CD	43
iTunes Festival: London 2012	Released: October 22, 2012; Label: Atlantic; Formats: Digital download, streaming	—
How It Started, How It's Going: Matchbox Twenty	Released: May 19, 2023; Label: Atlantic; Formats: Digital download, streaming	—
The North B-Sides	Released: February 27, 2026; Label: Atlantic; Formats: Digital download, streaming	—
"—" denotes a recording that did not chart or was not released in that territory.

== Singles ==
List of singles, with selected chart positions and certifications, showing year released and album name
Title	Year	Peak chart positions										Certifications	Album
Title	Year	US	US Pop	AUS	CAN	GER	JPN	NLD	NZ	SCO	UK	Certifications	Album
"Long Day"	1996	—	—	83	43	—	—	—	—	—	—	RIAA: Gold; ARIA: Platinum	Yourself or Someone Like You
"Push"	1997	— (Note: "Push" was not eligible to enter the Billboard Hot 100, but peaked at number five on the Hot 100 Airplay chart.)	3	8	6	91	—	61	—	30	38	RIAA: 5× Platinum; ARIA: 5× Platinum; RMNZ: 3× Platinum	Yourself or Someone Like You
"3AM"	1997	— (Note: "3AM" was not eligible to enter the Billboard Hot 100, but peaked at number three on the Hot 100 Airplay chart.)	2	31	1	96	—	92	—	57	64	RIAA: 5× Platinum; ARIA: 4× Platinum; RMNZ: 3× Platinum	Yourself or Someone Like You
"Real World"	1998	38	4	40	5	99	—	—	—	—	92	RIAA: Platinum; ARIA: Platinum; RMNZ: Gold	Yourself or Someone Like You
"Back 2 Good"	1998	24	8	—	11	—	—	—	—	—	—	RIAA: Platinum	Yourself or Someone Like You
"Bent"	2000	1	1	19	1	—	—	—	20	—	—	RIAA: Platinum; ARIA: Gold	Mad Season
"If You're Gone"	2000	5	4	18	6	84	84	95	12	43	50	RIAA: 2× Platinum; ARIA: 2× Platinum; RMNZ: Platinum	Mad Season
"Mad Season"	2001	48	20	42	15	—	—	—	34	62	76		Mad Season
"Last Beautiful Girl"	2001	— (Note: "Last Beautiful Girl" did not enter the Billboard Hot 100, but peaked at number 13 on the Bubbling Under Hot 100 Singles chart.)	— (Note: "Last Beautiful Girl" did not enter the Pop Airplay chart, but peaked at number 20 on the Adult Pop Airplay chart.)	—	—	—	—	—	—	—	96		Mad Season
"Disease"	2002	29	21	31	—	85	—	89	—	33	50		More Than You Think You Are
"Unwell"	2003	5	3	12	10	—	—	—	8	68	83	RIAA: 4× Platinum; ARIA: 3× Platinum; RMNZ: 2× Platinum	More Than You Think You Are
"Bright Lights"	2003	23	15	26	—	—	—	—	48	—	—	RIAA: Platinum	More Than You Think You Are
"Downfall"	2004	—	— (Note: "Downfall" did not enter the Pop Airplay chart, but peaked at number 27 on the Adult Pop Airplay chart.)	—	—	—	—	—	—	—	—		More Than You Think You Are
"All I Need"	2004	—	—	32	—	—	—	—	—	—	—		More Than You Think You Are
"How Far We've Come"	2007	11	14	7	4	60	—	—	11	40	157	RIAA: 3× Platinum; ARIA: 2× Platinum; RMNZ: Platinum	Exile on Mainstream
"All Your Reasons"	2008	—	—	34	—	—	—	—	—	—	—		Exile on Mainstream
"These Hard Times"	2008	— (Note: "These Hard Times" did not enter the Billboard Hot 100, but peaked at number 12 on the Bubbling Under Hot 100 Singles chart.)	40	—	—	—	—	—	—	—	—		Exile on Mainstream
"She's So Mean"	2012	40	31	26	31	—	42	—	19	—	—	RIAA: Platinum; ARIA: 3× Platinum; MC: Gold	North
"Overjoyed"	2012	—	— (Note: "Overjoyed" did not enter the Pop Airplay chart, but peaked at number 16 on the Adult Pop Airplay chart.)	—	—	—	—	—	—	—	—		North
"Our Song"	2013	—	— (Note: "Our Song" did not enter the Pop Airplay chart, but peaked at number 19 on the Adult Pop Airplay chart.)	—	—	—	—	—	—	—	—		North
"Wild Dogs (Running in a Slow Dream)"	2023	—	— (Note: "Wild Dogs (Running in a Slow Dream)" did not enter the Pop Airplay chart, but peaked at number 22 on the Adult Pop Airplay chart.)	—	—	—	—	—	—	—	—		Where the Light Goes
"Don't Get Me Wrong"	2023	—	— (Note: "Don't Get Me Wrong" did not enter the Pop Airplay chart, but peaked at number 17 on the Adult Pop Airplay chart.)	—	—	—	—	—	—	—	—		Where the Light Goes
"—" denotes a single that did not chart or was not released in that territory.

=== Promotional singles ===
List of promotional singles, with selected chart positions and certifications, showing year released and album name
Title	Year	Peak chart positions			Certifications	Album
Title	Year	US AAA	US Mains. Rock	AUS	Certifications	Album
"Girl Like That"	1998	—	—	—		Yourself or Someone Like You
"Crutch"	2000	20	36	—		Mad Season
"Angry"	2001	—	—	—		Mad Season
"Feel"	2003	—	33	—		More Than You Think You Are
"Put Your Hands Up"	2012	—	—	40	ARIA: Platinum	North
"Sleeping at the Wheel"	2013	—	—	—		North
"—" denotes a single that did not chart or was not released in that territory.

== Guest appearances ==
List of non-single guest appearances, with other performing artists, showing year released and album name
Title	Year	Other artist(s)	Album
"Never Going Back Again"	1998	none	Legacy: A Tribute to Fleetwood Mac's Rumours
"Lonely Weekend"	2001	none	Good Rockin' Tonight: The Legacy of Sun Records
"Mammas Don't Let Your Babies Grow Up to Be Cowboys"	2002	Willie Nelson	Willie Nelson & Friends – Stars & Guitars

== Music videos ==
List of music videos, showing year released and directors
Title	Year	Director(s)
"Long Day"	1996	Roger Pistole
"Push"	1997	Nigel Dick
"3AM"	1997	Gavin Bowden
"Real World"	1998	Matthew Rolston
"Back 2 Good"	1998	Paul Hunter
"Bent"	2000	Pedro Romhanyi
"If You're Gone"	2000	Pedro Romhanyi
"Mad Season"	2001	Phil Harder
"Crutch"	2001	Unknown
"Disease"	2002	Phil Harder
"Bent" (Live)	2002	Bob Sexton
"Unwell"	2003	Meiert Avis
"Bright Lights" (Live)	2003	Hamish Hamilton
"How Far We've Come"	2007	Ramon & Pedro
"These Hard Times"	2008	Ramon & Pedro
"She's So Mean"	2012	Rich Lee
"Our Song"	2012	Unknown
"Put Your Hands Up"	2012	Randall Slevin
"Overjoyed"	2012	Big TV!
"Wild Dogs (Running in a Slow Dream)"	2023	Jay Sprogell
"Don't Get Me Wrong"	2023	Unknown
