= North Tour =

2012–13 concert tour by Matchbox Twenty

- Tour by Matchbox Twenty
- Promotional poster for tour
- Associated album: North
- Start date: October 20, 2012
- End date: November 10, 2013
- Legs: 5
- No. of shows: 11 in Australia; 43 in North America; 8 in Europe; 3 in South America; 2 in Asia; 61 Total

Matchbox Twenty concert chronology
- Exile in America Tour (2008); North Tour (2012–13); 2013 Summer Tour (2013)

The North Tour is the fifth concert tour by American pop-rock band, Matchbox Twenty. The tour supports the band's fourth studio album, North. Beginning October 2012, the band has played over 60 shows in Australia, the Americas, Europe and Asia. The tour ranked 66th on Pollstar's annual "Top 100 Mid Year North American Tour". It earned $4.9 million from 40 shows.

== Background ==
The tour was announced in August 2012, via the band's official website. While promoting the album at several festival shows (including the iTunes Festival), the tour was marked to begin in Australia; October 2012. Dates in North America and Europe were revealed in November 2012. For the tour, the band has teamed up with Tickets-for-Charity, a charity offering tickets that supported charitable causes. With each ticket purchased through their website, TFC will donate a portion of the proceeds to the Children's Health Fund. Additionally, the band has partnered with Mobile Roadie to create a free app to follow the band on tour. The app will feature the band's video history, along with, previews of their current album. Users will also be able to follow an interactive map of the tour route and purchase tickets. Each person who downloads the app has a chance to win backstage passes for the tour.

== Opening acts ==
- Evermore (Australia, excluding Wollongong)
- INXS (Australia)
- Matt Hires (North America, select dates)
- Phillip Phillips (North America, select dates)

== Setlist ==
Australia
1. "Parade"
2. "Bent"
3. "Disease"
4. "She's So Mean"
5. "How Far We've Come"
6. "3 A.M."
7. "Real World"
8. "Radio"
9. "If You're Gone"
10. "Overjoyed"
11. "All Your Reasons"
12. "Long Day"
13. "Back 2 Good"
14. "I Will"
15. "Unwell"
16. "So Sad So Lonely"
17. "English Town"
18. "The Way"
19. "Bright Lights"
20. "Sleeping at the Wheel"

Encore

21. "Put Your Hands Up"
22. "You're So Real"
23. "Girl Like That"
24. "Push"

Notes

- For select shows, the band performed "Good Times with INXS.
North America
1. "Parade"
2. "Bent"
3. "Disease"
4. "She's So Mean"
5. "How Far We've Come"
6. "3 A.M."
7. "Real World"
8. "Girl Like That"
9. "If You're Gone"
10. "Overjoyed"
11. "All Your Reasons"
12. "Long Day"
13. "I Will"
14. "Unwell"
15. "Radio"
16. "Stay with Me"
17. "So Sad So Lonely"
18. "English Town"
19. "The Way"
20. "Bright Lights"
21. "Sleeping at the Wheel"

Encore

22. "Put Your Hands Up"
23. "Back 2 Good"
24. "The One I Love"
25. "Push"

== Tour dates ==
Date	City	Country	Venue
Australia
October 20, 2012	Melbourne	Australia	Rod Laver Arena
October 21, 2012	Melbourne	Australia	Rod Laver Arena
October 25, 2012	Canberra	Australia	AIS Arena
October 27, 2012	Brisbane	Australia	Brisbane Entertainment Centre
October 28, 2012	Brisbane	Australia	Brisbane Entertainment Centre
October 30, 2012	Sydney	Australia	Sydney Entertainment Centre
October 31, 2012	Sydney	Australia	Sydney Entertainment Centre
November 3, 2012	Pokolbin	Australia	Hope Estate Winery Amphitheatre
November 6, 2012	Wollongong	Australia	WIN Entertainment Centre
November 8, 2012	Adelaide	Australia	Adelaide Entertainment Centre
November 11, 2012	Perth	Australia	Perth Arena
North America
January 29, 2013	Catoosa	United States	The Joint
January 30, 2013	San Antonio	United States	Majestic Theatre
February 1, 2013	Thackerville	United States	Global Event Center
February 2, 2013	Longview	United States	Belcher Performance Center
February 5, 2013	Louisville	United States	Palace Theatre
February 6, 2013	Normal	United States	Braden Auditorium
February 8, 2013	Prior Lake	United States	Mystic Showroom
February 9, 2013	Milwaukee	United States	Riverside Theater
February 10, 2013	Des Moines	United States	Civic Center of Greater Des Moines
February 12, 2013	Fort Wayne	United States	Embassy Theatre
February 13, 2013	Kalamazoo	United States	Miller Auditorium
February 15, 2013	Toledo	United States	Stranahan Theater
February 16, 2013	Columbus	United States	Palace Theatre
February 17, 2013	Akron	United States	Akron Civic Theatre
February 19, 2013	Niagara Falls	Canada	Avalon Ballroom Theatre
February 20, 2013	Niagara Falls	Canada	Avalon Ballroom Theatre
February 21, 2013	Windsor	Canada	The Colosseum at Caesars Windsor
February 23, 2013	Atlantic City	United States	Borgata Event Center
February 25, 2013	Baltimore	United States	Modell Performing Arts Center
February 26, 2013	Port Chester	United States	Capitol Theatre
February 27, 2013	Bethlehem	United States	Sands Bethlehem Event Center
March 1, 2013	Augusta	United States	Augusta Civic Auditorium
March 2, 2013	Poughkeepsie	United States	Mid-Hudson Civic Center
March 3, 2013	Verona	United States	Turning Stone Event Center
March 5, 2013	Montclair	United States	Wellmont Theatre
March 6, 2013	Montclair	United States	Wellmont Theatre
March 8, 2013	Uncasville	United States	Mohegan Sun Arena
March 9, 2013	Huntington	United States	Paramount Theater
March 10, 2013	Richmond	United States	Landmark Theater
March 12, 2013	Savannah	United States	Johnny Mercer Theatre
March 13, 2013	Hollywood	United States	Hard Rock Live
March 16, 2013^{[A]}	Orlando	United States	Universal Music Plaza Stage
March 17, 2013	St. Augustine	United States	St. Augustine Amphitheatre
March 19, 2013	Greenville	United States	Peace Concert Hall
March 22, 2013	Lake Charles	United States	L'Auberge Event Center
March 23, 2013	Baton Rouge	United States	L'Auberge Baton Rouge Event Center
March 25, 2013	Austin	United States	Moody Theater
March 27, 2013	Albuquerque	United States	Legends Theater
March 29, 2013	Las Vegas	United States	Pearl Concert Theater
March 30, 2013	Indio	United States	Fantasy Springs Special Events Center
Europe
April 12, 2013	Dublin	Ireland	Vicar Street
April 13, 2013	Dublin	Ireland	Vicar Street
April 15, 2013	Southampton	England	Southampton Guildhall
April 16, 2013	London	England	Hammersmith Apollo
April 17, 2013	London	England	Hammersmith Apollo
April 19, 2013	Wolverhampton	England	Wolverhampton Civic Hall
April 20, 2013	Manchester	England	O_{2} Apollo
April 21, 2013	Glasgow	Scotland	O_{2} Academy
North America
July 26, 2013	Phoenix	United States	Comerica Theatre
July 27, 2013	Tucson	United States	Anselmo Valencia Tori Amphitheater
August 24, 2013	Big Flats	United States	Budweiser Summer Stage
South America
September 17, 2013^{[B]}	São Paulo	Brazil	Espaço das Américas
September 18, 2013	Curitiba	Brazil	Master Hall
September 20, 2013^{[C]}	Rio de Janeiro	Brazil	Parque dos Atletas
North America
September 23, 2013	Mexico City	Mexico	Arena Ciudad de México
September 25, 2013	Monterrey	Mexico	Monterrey Arena
Asia
November 4, 2013	Hong Kong		Star Hall
November 10, 2013	Singapore		Singapore Indoor Stadium

Festivals and other miscellaneous performances
^{A} This concert was a part of "Universal Orlando Mardi Gras"
^{B} This concert is a part of the "Live Music Rocks Concert Series"
^{C} This concert is a part of "Rock in Rio"

Cancellations and rescheduled shows

November 8, 2013	Pasay, Philippines	Mall of Asia Arena	Cancelled due to Typhoon Haiyan

=== Box office score data ===
Venue	City	Tickets sold / available	Gross revenue
Brisbane Entertainment Centre	Brisbane	11,228 / 12,087 (93%)	$1,611,060
Sydney Entertainment Centre	Sydney	11,025 / 11,908 (92%)	$1,341,170
Perth Arena	Perth	9,838 / 9,838 (100%)	$1,296,360
Braden Auditorium	Normal	3,358 / 3,358 (100%)	$206,959
Civic Center of Greater Des Moines	Des Moines	2,544 / 2,544 (100%)	$189,279
Embassy Theatre	Fort Wayne	2,339 / 2,339 (100%)	$159,915
The Colosseum at Caesars Windsor	Windsor	4,672 / 4,672 (100%)	$66,272
Mohegan Sun Arena	Uncasville	5,379 / 5,582 (96%)	$266,261
Landmark Theater	Richmond	3,272 / 3,393 (96%)	$197,416
Johnny Mercer Theatre	Savannah	2,379 / 2,379 (100%)	$116,159
Espaço das Américas	São Paulo	3,650 / 5,000 (73%)	$287,231
Master Hall	Curitiba	1,171 / 2,600 (45%)	$107,722
TOTAL		60,855 / 65,700 (93%)	$5,845,804

== Critical response ==
The shows in Australia received moderate praise from music critics. Noel Mengel (The Courier-Mail) stated the shows at the Brisbane Entertainment Centre, "restore his faith in modern rock 'n' roll", He says, "Matchbox pursue the middle path and they are very good at it. But after two hours of it, it seems the only one in the room who feels like smashing a guitar is me". For the two shows in Sydney, George Palathingal (The Canberra Times) gave the shows two and a half out of five stars. He explains, "[…] the songs follow such a similar pattern —big, promising opening guitar riffs lead to anthemic-but-generic soft-rock choruses, with Thomas's over-emoted vocals on top—that the set soon gets tiresome. Most in the room probably did 'have a good time tonight'. But that big finish was scant reward for those of us who just want better music throughout a headlining set". In Perth, the concert was deemed "an impressive evening" by Courtney Pearson (The West Australian). She says "They came back for an encore with synth-driven 'Put Your Hands Up' and 1997 hit 'Push', Thomas' voice so arresting you had to stand still and watch".

== Notes ==
1. Data from study is collected from all concerts held between January 1 and June 30, 2012 in North America. All monetary figures are based in U.S. dollars. All information is based upon extensive research conducted by Pollstar.
