= 2013 Summer Tour =

2013 concert tour by Matchbox Twenty and the Goo Goo Dolls

- Tour by Matchbox Twenty and the Goo Goo Dolls
- Promotional poster for tour
- Associated album: North; Magnetic
- Start date: June 25, 2013
- End date: August 29, 2013
- Legs: 1
- No. of shows: 40 in North America
Matchbox Twenty chronology
North Tour (2012–13)	2013 Summer Tour (2013)	A Brief History of Everything Tour (2017)
Goo Goo Dolls chronology
Something for the Rest of Us Tour (2010–11)	2013 Summer Tour (2013)	Canada 2014 (2014)

The 2013 Summer Tour was a co-headlining tour by American bands Matchbox Twenty and the Goo Goo Dolls. Beginning in June 2013, the tour supported the band's albums, North and Magnetic respectively. The tour included more than 30 dates in the United States and Canada.

== Background ==
After the California Mid-State Fair announced their 2013 concert lineup, media outlet began to speculate of the joint tour between the two bands. They were later paired for the Ravinia Festival. Rob Thomas confirmed the outing on March 15, 2013, during an interview on 96.5 TIC FM. Thomas explained many summer tours are a "package deal" and feels it more fun to tour with others. He continued to say, "You are putting together that whole night of music from the minute people sit down. You want to have what is going to feel like a whole night that everybody is going to enjoy [...] It's not going to be one band for one group of people, and one band for another".

== Opening act ==
- Kate Earl (select dates)

== Setlist ==
Goo Goo Dolls
1. "Last Hot Night"
2. "Slide"
3. "Naked"
4. "Here Is Gone"
5. "Rebel Beat"
6. "Black Balloon"
7. "Now I Hear", "January Friend", or "Smash"
8. "Another Second Time Around"
9. "Let Love In"
10. "Come to Me"
11. "Name"
12. "Bringing on the Light"
13. "Give a Little Bit" (Supertramp cover)
14. "Better Days"
15. "Stay with You"
16. "Iris"
17. "Broadway"
Matchbox Twenty
1. "Parade"
2. "Bent"
3. "Disease"
4. "She's So Mean"
5. "How Far We've Come"
6. "3 A.M."
7. "Real World"
8. "If You're Gone"
9. "Overjoyed"
10. "Long Day"
11. "I Will"
12. "Unwell"
13. "Radio"
14. "English Town"
15. "Bright Lights"

Encore

1. "Back 2 Good"
2. "Our Song"
3. "Push"

== Tour dates ==
Date	City	Country	Venue
North America
June 25, 2013	Manchester	United States	Verizon Wireless Arena
June 26, 2013	Saratoga Springs	United States	Saratoga Performing Arts Center
June 27, 2013	Toronto	Canada	Molson Canadian Amphitheatre
June 29, 2013	Burgettstown	United States	First Niagara Pavilion
June 30, 2013	Cincinnati	United States	Riverbend Music Center
July 2, 2013^{[A]}	Highland Park	United States	Ravinia Park Pavilion
July 3, 2013^{[A]}	Highland Park	United States	Ravinia Park Pavilion
July 4, 2013^{[A]}	Highland Park	United States	Ravinia Park Pavilion
July 6, 2013	Clarkston	United States	DTE Energy Music Theatre
July 7, 2013	Noblesville	United States	Klipsch Music Center
July 9, 2013	Maryland Heights	United States	Verizon Wireless Amphitheater
July 10, 2013	Moline	United States	iWireless Center
July 12, 2013	Kansas City	United States	Sprint Center
July 13, 2013^{[B]}	Minneapolis	United States	Basilica of Saint Mary
July 15, 2013	Greenwood Village	United States	Fiddler's Green Amphitheatre
July 17, 2013	Los Angeles	United States	Gibson Amphitheatre
July 20, 2013	Irvine	United States	Verizon Wireless Amphitheatre
July 21, 2013^{[C]}	Paso Robles	United States	Chumash Grandstand Arena
July 23, 2013	Concord	United States	Sleep Train Pavilion
July 30, 2013	The Woodlands	United States	Cynthia Woods Mitchell Pavilion
July 31, 2013	Dallas	United States	Gexa Energy Pavilion
August 2, 2013	Pelham	United States	Oak Mountain Amphitheatre
August 3, 2013	Atlanta	United States	Aaron's Amphitheatre at Lakewood
August 4, 2013	Tampa	United States	MidFlorida Credit Union Amphitheatre
August 6, 2013	Charlotte	United States	Verizon Wireless Amphitheatre
August 7, 2013	Raleigh	United States	Time Warner Cable Music Pavilion
August 8, 2013	Virginia Beach	United States	Farm Bureau Live
August 10, 2013	Bristow	United States	Jiffy Lube Live
August 11, 2013	Camden	United States	Susquehanna Bank Center
August 13, 2013	Uncasville	United States	Mohegan Sun Arena
August 14, 2013	Hershey	United States	Star Pavilion
August 16, 2013	Holmdel Township	United States	PNC Bank Arts Center
August 17, 2013	Wantagh	United States	Nikon at Jones Beach Theater
August 18, 2013	Mansfield	United States	Comcast Center
August 20, 2013	Salisbury	United States	Wicomico Youth and Civic Center
August 21, 2013	Charleston	United States	Charleston Civic Center
August 22, 2013	Cuyahoga Falls	United States	Blossom Music Center
August 25, 2013	London	Canada	Budweiser Gardens
August 26, 2013	Rama	Canada	Casino Rama Entertainment Centre
August 28, 2013	Moncton	Canada	Moncton Coliseum
August 29, 2013	Halifax	Canada	Halifax Metro Centre

Festivals and other miscellaneous performances
^{A} These concerts were a part of the "Ravinia Festival"
^{B} This concert was a part of the Basilica Block Party
^{C} This concert was a part of the "California Mid-State Fair"

=== Box office score data ===
Venue	City	Tickets sold / Available	Gross revenue
Sprint Center	Kansas City	6,916 / 9,753 (72%)	$513,296
Mohegan Sun Arena	Uncasville	5,164 / 5,475 (94%)	$331,736
Budweiser Gardens	London	5,002 / 7,235 (69%)	$291,451

== Gross ==
Total available gross: 413,418 tickets sold, $15.5 million from 42 shows

== Critical reception ==
The tour received good feedback from music critics. For the concert in Saratoga Springs, Andrew Champagne (The Saratogian) stated the show was energetic and crowd pleasing. He went on to say, "The three acts combined to play for over three hours and provided plenty of high points on a gorgeous summer evening, The fans in the pavilion and on the lawn were all too happy to oblige". At the Molson Canadian Amphitheatre, Nick Krewen (Toronto Star) gave the show three out of four stars. He writes, "Their musicianship was solid, if not spectacular, songwriter Johnny Rzeznik, relied more on the strength of the songs than their reliance on technology". Katie Foglia (Pittsburgh Post-Gazette) called the show at the First Niagara Pavilion overwhelming. She explained, "After the sun faded, an introductory video hit the screens. The energy was palpable. although marketed as co-headliners, it became clear that the Goo Goo Dolls just started the show—and Matchbox Twenty ended it".
