= Real World (Matchbox Twenty song) =

1998 single by Matchbox Twenty

Single by Matchbox 20

from the album Yourself or Someone Like You
- Released: March 24, 1998
- Studio: Triclops (Atlanta, Georgia)
- Genre: Alternative rock
- Length: 3:51
- Label: Atlantic; Lava; Melisma
- Songwriter: Rob Thomas
- Producer: Matt Serletic

Matchbox 20 singles chronology
"3AM" (1997)	"Real World" (1998)	"Back 2 Good" (1998)

"Real World" is a song by American rock group Matchbox 20. It was released in March 1998 as the fourth single from their debut album, Yourself or Someone Like You (1996). The single was initially ineligible to chart on the US Billboard Hot 100 due to not receiving a physical release in North America; it instead peaked at number nine on the Billboard Hot 100 Airplay chart in August 1998. However, in December 1998, the Hot 100 chart rules were changed to allow airplay-only singles to chart. As a result, "Real World" became the band's first single to enter the listing, debuting and peaking at number 38. Worldwide, "Real World" reached number five in Canada and number 40 in Australia.

== Content ==
The song was written by lead singer Rob Thomas, and details him wondering about what it would be like if he lived in various settings other than the current one, including a superhero, a rainmaker, and being a boss at a job, and if they would worsen or improve his life.

== Music video ==
The music video, directed by Matthew Rolston, starts with Rob walking through a bowling alley with a camel, a scene that was filmed at The Dust Bowl in Alice Springs, Northern Territory, Australia. It then shows him on a street, where Kyle Cook is on an ice cream truck, but instead of selling ice cream, he unveils what appears to be a raw steak. Next, Rob is doing a news broadcast, with Brian Yale acting as a director. In the meantime, intercut with this is a diner with Paul Doucette dressed as a waitress, eventually discarding the outfit. In the midst of the news broadcast, there is a breakfast cereal commercial with Adam Gaynor sitting with a family. The video concludes with the camera going back and forth between Rob with the camel and at the news station.

== Track listings ==
European and Australian CD single

1. "Real World" – 3:50
2. "Long Day" (live) – 3:53
3. "3am" (live) – 3:45

Japanese CD single

1. "Real World"
2. "Push" (live acoustic)
3. "3am" (live acoustic)
4. "Busted" (live acoustic)

== Credits and personnel ==
Credits are taken from the Yourself or Someone Like You liner notes.

Studios

- Recorded at Triclops Recording (Atlanta, Georgia)
- Mixed at House of Blues Studios (Memphis, Tennessee)
- Mastered at Precision Mastering (Los Angeles)

Matchbox 20

- Rob Thomas – writing, vocals
- Kyle Cook – backing vocals, lead guitar
- Adam Gaynor – backing vocals, rhythm guitar
- Brian Yale – bass guitar
- Paul Doucette – drums

Others

- Jan Smith – vocal coach
- Tony Adams – guitar tech
- Matt Serletic – keyboards, percussion, production, mixing
- Craig Poole – drum tech
- John Nielsen – recording assistance
- Greg Archilla – mixing
- Malcolm Springer – mixing assistance
- Jeff Tomei – engineering
- Don C. Tyler – digital editing
- Stephen Marcussen – mastering

== Charts ==
=== Weekly charts ===
Chart (1998)	Peak position
Australia (ARIA)	40
Canada Top Singles (RPM)	5
Canada Adult Contemporary (RPM)	45
Canada Rock/Alternative (RPM)	8
Germany (GfK)	99
UK Singles (Official Charts)	92
US Billboard Hot 100	38
US Adult Alternative Airplay (Billboard)	4
US Adult Pop Airplay (Billboard)	3
US Alternative Airplay (Billboard)	13
US Mainstream Rock (Billboard)	17
US Pop Airplay (Billboard)	4

=== Year-end charts ===
Chart (1998)	Position
Canada Top Singles (RPM)	17
US Adult Top 40 (Billboard)	8
US Mainstream Rock Tracks (Billboard)	56
US Modern Rock Tracks (Billboard)	35
US Mainstream Top 40 (Billboard)	8
US Triple-A (Billboard)	13

== Certifications ==
Region	Certification	Certified units/sales
Australia (ARIA)	Platinum	70,000^{‡}
New Zealand (RMNZ)	Gold	15,000^{‡}
United States (RIAA)	Platinum	1,000,000^{‡}
^{‡} Sales+streaming figures based on certification alone.

== Release history ==
Region	Date	Format	Label(s)	Ref.
United States	March 24, 1998	Alternative radio	Atlantic; Lava; Melisma	
United States	May 12, 1998	Contemporary hit radio	Atlantic; Lava; Melisma	
Europe	September 7, 1998	CD	Atlantic; Lava; Melisma	
Japan	September 25, 1998	CD	Atlantic; Lava; Melisma; EastWest Japan	
