= Back 2 Good =

1998 single by Matchbox Twenty

Single by Matchbox 20

from the album Yourself or Someone Like You
- B-side: "Push"
- Released: September 22, 1998
- Studio: Triclops (Atlanta, Georgia)
- Genre: Post-grunge
- Length: 5:40; 4:10 (radio edit)
- Label: Atlantic; Lava
- Songwriters: Rob Thomas; Matt Serletic
- Producer: Matt Serletic

Matchbox 20 singles chronology
"Real World" (1998)	"Back 2 Good" (1998)	"Bent" (2000)

Music video
- "Back 2 Good" on YouTube

"Back 2 Good" is a song by American rock band Matchbox 20, released as the fifth single from their 1996 debut album, Yourself or Someone Like You, in September 1998.

== Meaning ==
The song was written by lead singer Rob Thomas and producer Matt Serletic, and is about a romantic relationship that seems to have reached its end, much to the chagrin of the singer. Rob Thomas has described the song to be about “screwing up so often that you become used to it.” Thomas has also said that “Back 2 Good”, over all other songs on the album “holds up as a song”.

== Music video ==
"Back 2 Good" was released with a music video, directed by an uncredited Paul Hunter. The music video features the band walking through a street carnival while Thomas sings the lyrics to the song.

== Release and reception ==
"Back 2 Good" was the band's biggest hit song on the US Billboard Hot 100 from Yourself or Someone Like You—peaking at number 24 in 1999—because their more successful prior hits, "Push" and "3AM", were not allowed to chart due to not receiving commercial releases in the US. The chart rules were changed in December 1998 to allow songs to chart from airplay alone, making "Back 2 Good" their first single able to receive a full chart run. In Canada, the song peaked at number 11 on the RPM 100 Hit Tracks chart, becoming the band's fourth top-20 hit.

== Track listings ==
US 7-inch single

A. "Back 2 Good" – 5:40
B. "Push" – 3:59

Australian CD single

1. "Back 2 Good" – 5:40
2. "Kody" (MTV's Live from the 10 Spot) – 3:57
3. "Damn" (MTV's Live from the 10 Spot) – 3:57

== Credits and personnel ==
Credits are taken from the Yourself or Someone Like You liner notes.

Studios

- Recorded at Triclops Recording (Atlanta, Georgia)
- Mixed at House of Blues Studios (Memphis, Tennessee)
- Mastered at Precision Mastering (Los Angeles)

Matchbox 20

- Rob Thomas – writing, vocals
- Kyle Cook – backing vocals, lead guitar
- Adam Gaynor – backing vocals, rhythm guitar
- Brian Yale – bass guitar
- Paul Doucette – drums

Others

- Matt Serletic – writing, keyboards, percussion, woodwinds composing and arrangement, production, mixing
- Jan Smith – vocal coach
- Tony Adams – guitar tech
- Craig Poole – drum tech
- Elizabeth Burkhardt – woodwinds leader, bassoon
- Amy Porter – flute
- Yvonne Powers – oboe
- Ted Gurch – clarinet
- Douglas Smith – bass clarinet
- John Nielsen – recording assistance
- Greg Archilla – mixing
- Malcolm Springer – mixing assistance
- Jeff Tomei – engineering
- Don C. Tyler – digital editing
- Stephen Marcussen – mastering

== Charts ==
=== Weekly charts ===
Chart (1998–1999)	Peak position
Canada Top Singles (RPM)	11
Canada Adult Contemporary (RPM)	35
US Billboard Hot 100	24
US Adult Alternative Airplay (Billboard)	11
US Adult Pop Airplay (Billboard)	4
US Pop Airplay (Billboard)	8

=== Year-end charts ===
Chart (1998)	Position
US Adult Top 40 (Billboard)	89

Chart (1999)	Position
Canada Top Singles (RPM)	75
US Billboard Hot 100	49
US Adult Top 40 (Billboard)	3
US Mainstream Top 40 (Billboard)	20

== Certifications ==
Region	Certification	Certified units/sales
United States (RIAA)	Platinum	1,000,000^{‡}
^{‡} Sales+streaming figures based on certification alone.
