= Long Day =

1996 single by Matchbox Twenty

Single by Matchbox 20

from the album Yourself or Someone Like You
- B-side: "3 AM" (acoustic)
- Released: September 16, 1996
- Studio: Triclops (Atlanta, Georgia)
- Length: 3:45
- Label: Atlantic; Lava; Melisma
- Songwriter: Rob Thomas
- Producer: Matt Serletic

Matchbox 20 singles chronology
"Long Day" (1996)	"Push" (1997)

"Long Day" is the first single and second track from American rock band Matchbox 20's debut album, Yourself or Someone Like You (1996). The cover of the single features a parody of a Diamond Matches box. The song peaked at number eight on the US Billboard Mainstream Rock Tracks chart and stayed in the top 10 for seven weeks. The song also charted in Canada and Australia, reaching numbers 43 and 83, respectively.

== Music video ==
The video for "Long Day" (directed by Roger Pistole), like most of the band's material centers around Matchbox Twenty, but is punctuated by black and white shots from an old movie. Thomas has shorter hair than in the subsequent clips and is dressed in a suit and sunglasses.

== Track listing ==
Australian maxi-CD single

1. "Long Day" (radio edit)
2. "Long Day" (acoustic)
3. "3 AM" (acoustic version)
4. "Long Day" (LP version)

== Credits and personnel ==
Credits are taken from the Yourself or Someone Like You liner notes.

Studios

- Recorded at Triclops Recording (Atlanta, Georgia)
- Mixed at House of Blues Studios (Memphis, Tennessee)
- Mastered at Precision Mastering (Los Angeles)

Matchbox 20

- Rob Thomas – writing, vocals
- Kyle Cook – backing vocals, lead guitar
- Adam Gaynor – backing vocals, rhythm guitar
- Brian Yale – bass guitar
- Paul Doucette – drums

Others

- Jan Smith – vocal coach
- Tony Adams – guitar tech
- Matt Serletic – keyboards, percussion, production, mixing
- Craig Poole – drum tech
- John Nielsen – recording assistance
- Greg Archilla – mixing
- Malcolm Springer – mixing assistance
- Jeff Tomei – engineering
- Don C. Tyler – digital editing
- Stephen Marcussen – mastering

== Charts ==
=== Weekly charts ===
Weekly chart performance for "Long Day"
Chart (1997–1998)	Peak position
Australia (ARIA)	83
Canada Top Singles (RPM)	43
Canada Rock/Alternative (RPM)	18
US Mainstream Rock (Billboard)	8

=== Year-end charts ===
Year-end chart performance for "Long Day"
Chart (1997)	Position
US Mainstream Rock Tracks (Billboard)	48

== Certifications ==
Certifications for "Long Day"
Region	Certification	Certified units/sales
Australia (ARIA)	Platinum	70,000^{‡}
United States (RIAA)	Gold	500,000^{‡}
^{‡} Sales+streaming figures based on certification alone.
