= Bent (Matchbox Twenty song) =

2000 single by Matchbox Twenty

Single by Matchbox Twenty

from the album Mad Season
- B-side: "Push" (acoustic); "Don't Let Me Down" (live); "Busted" (live)
- Released: April 17, 2000
- Studio: Tree Sound (Atlanta, Georgia); East Iris, Oceanway (Nashville, Tennessee)
- Genre: Rock
- Length: 4:16
- Label: Atlantic; Lava; Melisma
- Songwriter: Rob Thomas
- Producer: Matt Serletic

Matchbox Twenty singles chronology
| "Back 2 Good" (1998) | "Bent" (2000) | "If You're Gone" (2000) |

Music video
- "Bent" on YouTube

"Bent" is a song by American alternative rock band Matchbox Twenty. The rock ballad was serviced to radio on April 17, 2000, as the lead single from their second album, Mad Season. "Bent" became the band's first and only song to top the US Billboard Hot 100, reaching number one on the chart dated July 22, 2000. The song also topped the RPM 100 Hit Tracks chart in Canada for five nonconsecutive weeks. "Bent" was nominated for Best Rock Song at the 43rd Annual Grammy Awards and won the award for Most Performed Foreign Work at the APRA Music Awards of 2001.

== Background and writing ==
Rob Thomas told Billboard magazine that it's "a love song and a rock song; there's a hopeful tone to it. It's kind of like the person is saying, 'As misguided as I may be, these are things that it takes to be with me.'" This was Thomas' first attempt at a love song and he believes it is co-dependent of the 21st century. Thomas spoke on Storytellers that the song is about two people who are "both messed up", but they are together, so it does not matter. Along with the rest of Mad Season, the band recorded "Bent" at three studios: Tree Sound Studios in Atlanta, Georgia, and East Iris and Oceanway Studios in Nashville, Tennessee.

== Release ==
On April 17, 2000, Atlantic, Lava, and Melisma Records serviced "Bent" to US and Australian radio stations. The first US formats to receive the track were hot adult contemporary, modern adult contemporary, and triple A stations. In Australia, Warner Music Australia made the song available for streaming on its website the same day. The following day, "Bent" was added to four more US radio formats: mainstream rock, active rock, alternative, and contemporary hit radio. After the track spent two weeks on the air, on May 1, Australia distributed the first commercial format of the single: a three-track CD. The disc contains "Bent", a live cover version of the Beatles' "Don't Let Me Down", and a live performance of "Busted", a track from Matchbox 20's previous album, Yourself or Someone Like You (1996); both live tracks were recorded in 1998 in Sydney, Australia. This CD was also released in Japan on June 7, 2000. In the United States, the two-track physical single arrived in stores on July 5, 2000, across three formats: 7-inch vinyl, CD, and cassette. All versions contain an acoustic version of "Push", originally from Yourself or Someone Like You, as the B-side. On July 17, a CD and cassette single were released in the United Kingdom; the CD features the same track listing as the Australian and Japanese versions. In Europe, a two-track disc was also issued, omitting "Busted".

== Commercial performance ==
On April 29, 2000, "Bent" debuted at number 60 on the US Billboard Hot 100 chart, becoming that week's highest debut. The track entered the top 40 the following week and rose into the top 10 on July 8. Two issues later, the song jumped from number six to number one, becoming Matchbox Twenty's highest-charting single in the United States. The song spent that week only at number one and remained on the Hot 100 for 39 weeks altogether. In addition to topping the Hot 100, "Bent" also peaked at number one on the Billboard Adult Top 40 chart (13 weeks), the Mainstream Top 40 ranking (three weeks), and the Triple-A listing (14 weeks). On other Billboard charts, the song peaked at number 24 on the Mainstream Rock Tracks chart and number 16 on the Modern Rock Tracks chart. "Bent" was the ninth-most-successful song of 2000 as well as the 78th-most-successful song of the 2000s decade in the US, and the Recording Industry Association of America (RIAA) awarded the song with a platinum sales certification in September 2023, denoting sales and streaming figures of 1,000,000 units.

In Canada, "Bent" became a radio hit. On the country's RPM 100 Hit Tracks chart, the song debuted at number 30 on May 1, 2000. Three weeks later, on May 22, the single entered the top 10, and it reached the number-two position on July 17. Although the song fell to number three the following issue, it jumped to number one on July 31. The song stayed at that position for five nonconsecutive weeks, briefly dropping out of number one on the week of August 14, when the Moffatts's "Bang Bang Boom" ascended to the top position. "Bent" remained on the 100 Hit Tracks chart for 28 weeks, after which RPM ceased publication. The song was also successful on Canadian rock radio, topping the RPM Top 30 Rock Report for two weeks in June 2000. It additionally appeared on the RPM Adult Contemporary Tracks ranking, peaking at number 24 that September.

Outside Anglo-America, "Bent" charted in several other countries. In Costa Rica, the track reached number four on El Siglo de Torreón's singles ranking, compiled by Notimex. On Australia's ARIA Singles Chart, "Bent" first appeared on the week starting May 8, 2000, at number 28. On May 22, it ascended to its peak of number 19, giving Matchbox Twenty their fourth top-40 Australian hit. The song stayed within the ARIA top 50 for 12 weeks, leaving the chart on the week starting August 7. At the end of the year, the Australian Recording Industry Association (ARIA) ranked the track at number 89 on their year-end chart, and the single shipped over 35,000 copies in Australia, qualifying it for a gold record there. In neighboring New Zealand, "Bent" gave Matchbox Twenty their first charting New Zealand hit when it debuted at number 40 on the RIANZ Singles Chart on May 28, 2000, and began rising up the ranking. After a two-week fall starting on June 18, the song reversed direction and moved to number 20, its peak, on July 9, remaining there for the following week as well. In total, "Bent" logged 16 weeks inside the New Zealand top 50.

== Music video ==
The video, directed by Pedro Romhanyi, seems to be a bit of a play on Rob Thomas' increased profile following the 1999 mega-hit, "Smooth", since it features other members of the band mistreating him. It starts with him being hit by a car driven by Adam Gaynor. As he lies on the ground, Kyle Cook shows up and empties Thomas of all money in his wallet. After this, Rob recovers from the car hit and walks off, singing the chorus. After the first chorus, he bumps into Paul Doucette. Rob sings a few more lines to a clearly unimpressed Paul, who basically shoves Rob out of his way. At this point Rob walks off again, singing the second chorus, and the wind seems to hit him stronger than it hits other people. He then heads into an alley where day and night intermix. He is assaulted yet again by Kyle Cook, at which point, Brian Yale shows up apparently to help him off the ground. Rob refuses the hand and walks off, eventually leaving the alleyway and emerging back into the daylight, when the events seem to recur from the beginning of the video.

== Awards and nominations ==
| Year | Award | Category | Nominee(s) | Result | Ref. |
|---|---|---|---|---|---|
| 2001 | 43rd Annual Grammy Awards | Best Rock Song | "Bent" | Nominated | |
| 2001 | APRA Music Awards of 2001 | Most Performed Foreign Work | "Bent" | Won | |

== Track listings ==
US CD, 7-inch, and cassette single

1. "Bent" – 4:17
2. "Push" (acoustic) – 4:21

Australian, Japanese, and UK CD single

1. "Bent" – 4:16
2. "Don't Let Me Down" (live from Australia) – 4:11
3. "Busted" (live from Australia) – 4:33

European CD single

1. "Bent" – 4:19
2. "Don't Let Me Down" (live from Australia) – 4:16

== Credits and personnel ==
Credits are adapted from the Mad Season album booklet and the European CD single liner notes.

Studios

- Recorded at Tree Sound Studios (Atlanta, Georgia), East Iris Studios, and Oceanway Studios (Nashville, Tennessee)
- Mixed at East Iris Studios (Nashville, Tennessee)
- Mastered at Stephen Marcussen Mastering (Hollywood, California)

Personnel

- Rob Thomas – writing, vocals
- Kyle Cook – lead guitar, background vocals
- Adam Gaynor – rhythm guitar, background vocals
- Brian Yale – bass
- Paul Doucette – drums
- Matt Serletic – production
- Noel Golden – recording
- Shawn Grove – recording assistance, additional Pro Tools editing
- Robert Hannon – recording assistance
- Greg Fogie – recording assistance
- David Thoener – mixing
- Kevin Szymanski – mixing assistance
- Mark Dobson – additional engineering, Pro Tools, digital editing
- Stephen Marcussen – mastering
- Stewart Whitmore – mastering

== Charts ==
=== Weekly charts ===
| Chart (2000) | Peak position |
|---|---|
| Australia (ARIA) | 19 |
| Canada Top Singles (RPM) | 1 |
| Canada Adult Contemporary (RPM) | 24 |
| Canada Rock/Alternative (RPM) | 1 |
| Costa Rica (Notimex) | 4 |
| Latvia (Latvijas Top 40) | 19 |
| New Zealand (Recorded Music NZ) | 20 |
| Quebec (ADISQ) | 2 |
| US Billboard Hot 100 | 1 |
| US Adult Alternative Airplay (Billboard) | 1 |
| US Adult Pop Airplay (Billboard) | 1 |
| US Alternative Airplay (Billboard) | 16 |
| US Mainstream Rock (Billboard) | 24 |
| US Pop Airplay (Billboard) | 1 |

=== Year-end charts ===
| Chart (2000) | Position |
|---|---|
| Australia (ARIA) | 89 |
| US Billboard Hot 100 | 9 |
| US Adult Top 40 (Billboard) | 4 |
| US Mainstream Top 40 (Billboard) | 2 |
| US Mainstream Rock Tracks (Billboard) | 88 |
| US Modern Rock Tracks (Billboard) | 55 |
| US Triple-A (Billboard) | 2 |

| Chart (2001) | Position |
|---|---|
| US Adult Top 40 (Billboard) | 32 |

=== Decade-end charts ===
| Chart (2000–2009) | Position |
|---|---|
| US Billboard Hot 100 | 78 |

== Certifications ==
| Region | Certification | Certified units/sales |
|---|---|---|
| Australia (ARIA) | Gold | 35,000^{^} |
| United States (RIAA) | Platinum | 1,000,000^{‡} |
^{^} Shipments figures based on certification alone.^{‡} Sales+streaming figures based on certification alone.

== Release history ==
| Region | Date | Formats(s) | Label(s) | Ref(s). |
|---|---|---|---|---|
| Australia | April 17, 2000 | Radio; streaming | Atlantic; Lava; Melisma | |
| United States | April 17, 2000 | Hot adult contemporary; modern adult contemporary; triple A radio | Atlantic; Lava; Melisma | |
| United States | April 18, 2000 | Mainstream rock; active rock; alternative; contemporary hit radio | Atlantic; Lava; Melisma | |
| Australia | May 1, 2000 | CD | Atlantic; Lava; Melisma | |
| Japan | June 7, 2000 | CD | Atlantic; Lava; Melisma | |
| United States | July 5, 2000 | 7-inch vinyl; CD; cassette | Atlantic; Lava; Melisma | |
| United Kingdom | July 17, 2000 | CD; cassette | Atlantic; Lava; Melisma | |
