= Yourself or Someone Like You =

Studio album by Matchbox 20
- Released: October 1, 1996
- Recorded: May−June 1996
- Studio: Triclops Recording, Atlanta, Georgia
- Genre: Alternative rock; post-grunge; pop rock
- Length: 46:51
- Label: Melisma; Lava; Atlantic
- Producer: Matt Serletic

Matchbox 20 chronology
Yourself or Someone Like You (1996)	Mad Season (2000)

Singles from Yourself or Someone Like You
- 1. "Long Day" Released: September 16, 1996; 2. "Push" Released: June 10, 1997; 3. "3AM" Released: October 6, 1997; 4. "Real World" Released: March 24, 1998; 5. "Back 2 Good" Released: September 22, 1998

Yourself or Someone Like You is the debut album by American rock band Matchbox 20. It was released on October 1, 1996, by Lava Records and Atlantic Records. The album has been certified 12× Platinum by the Recording Industry Association of America.

== Composition and release ==
Professional ratings
Review scores
Source	Rating
AllMusic	3.5/5 stars
Christgau's Consumer Guide	(1-star Honorable Mention)
Q	4/5 stars
The Rolling Stone Album Guide	4/5 stars
The Times	7/10
Uncut	4/5 stars

The album features a sound similar to traditional rock and post-grunge. The album features themes of adolescence, adultery, loneliness, domestic violence, psychological abuse, humiliation, depression, anger, and alcoholism.

According to Rob Thomas, the album's title was originally to be Woodshed Diaries. However, that changed when Thomas and Paul Doucette were at a woman's musical performance at Café Largo when the singer said "this song is for you, or someone like you". They loved the phrase so much that they insisted on changing the album's title, despite the fact that 3,500 copies of the album with the original title had already been made. Their labels agreed; however, the name change resulted in the album's release being delayed.

The album sold a mere 610 copies in its first week; however, it eventually went on to sell several million copies in the United States. Yourself or Someone Like You became one of the few albums to achieve the prestigious Diamond certification, and it was also certified multi-platinum in Australia, Canada and New Zealand. To date, the album has sold more than 15 million copies worldwide.

== Artwork lawsuit ==
In 2005, almost a decade after the album's release, the band was sued by Frank Torres, the man on the album's cover. Torres claimed the band never asked for his permission to use his image on the sleeve. In the litigation, Torres claimed the photo was taken as he was walking down the street after being asked to pose. He also claimed the photo had caused him emotional distress. Torres justified the delay in suing Matchbox 20 by claiming he had first seen the album photo within two years of the litigation. The lawsuit was later dismissed. Torres died in 2016 at age 73.

== Track listing ==
All tracks are written by Rob Thomas, except where noted.

No.	Title	Writer(s)	Length
1.	"Real World"		3:50
2.	"Long Day"		3:45
3.	"3AM"	Thomas; Brian Yale; John Leslie Goff; John Joseph Stanley	3:46
4.	"Push"	Thomas; Matt Serletic	3:59
5.	"Girl Like That"		3:45
6.	"Back 2 Good"	Thomas; Serletic	5:40
7.	"Damn"		3:20
8.	"Argue"		2:58
9.	"Kody"		4:03
10.	"Busted"		4:15
11.	"Shame"		3:35
12.	"Hang"		3:47
Total length:			46:51

Deluxe edition bonus tracks
No.	Title	Writer(s)	Length
13.	"Push" (Acoustic)	Thomas; Serletic	4:20
14.	"Busted" (Live from Australia)		4:36
15.	"Shame" (Acoustic)		3:40

Australian edition bonus CD
No.	Title	Writer(s)	Length
1.	"Girl Like That" (Live)		3:57
2.	"Kody" (Live)		4:01
3.	"Damn" (Live)		3:32
4.	"Mercy, Mercy Me" (Live)	Marvin Gaye	3:01
5.	"Push" (Acoustic)	Thomas; Serletic	4:12
6.	"3AM" (Acoustic)	Thomas; Yale; Goff; Stanley	3:56

== Personnel ==
Matchbox 20

- Rob Thomas – lead vocals; acoustic guitar on "Hang"
- Kyle Cook – lead guitar, backing vocals, co-lead vocals on "Hang"
- Adam Gaynor – rhythm guitar, backing vocals
- Brian Yale – bass
- Paul Doucette – drums

Additional musicians

- Matt Serletic – keyboards, percussion
- Elizabeth Burkhardt – bassoon and woodwind leader on "Back 2 Good"
- Amy Porter – flute on "Back 2 Good"
- Yvonne Powers – oboe on "Back 2 Good"
- Ted Gurch – clarinet on "Back 2 Good"
- Douglas Smith – bass clarinet on "Back 2 Good"

Production

- Matt Serletic – producer, mixing engineer
- Jeff Tomei – engineer
- Travis McGehee – engineer/mixing engineer
- John Nielsen – assistant engineer
- Greg Archilla – mixing engineer
- Malcolm Springer – assistant mixing engineer
- Stephen Marcussen – mastering engineer
- Don C. Tyler – digital editing
- Tony Adams – drum tech
- Craig Poole – guitar tech
- Jan Smith – vocal coach
- Valerie Wagner – art direction, graphic design
- Katrin Thomas – photography
- Chris Cuffaro – band photo

== Charts ==
=== Weekly charts ===
Weekly chart performance for Yourself or Someone Like You
Chart (1996–1998)	Peak position
Australian Albums (ARIA)	1
Canadian Albums (Billboard)	11
Dutch Albums (Album Top 100)	50
German Albums (Offizielle Top 100)	21
New Zealand Albums (RMNZ)	3
Swiss Albums (Schweizer Hitparade)	46
UK Albums (OCC)	50
US Billboard 200	5

=== Year-end charts ===
Year-end performance for Yourself or Someone Like You
Chart (1997)	Position
Australian Albums (ARIA)	40
Canadian Albums (Nielsen Soundscan)	37
New Zealand Albums (RMNZ)	42
US Billboard 200	22
Chart (1998)	Position
Australian Albums (ARIA)	1
New Zealand Albums (RMNZ)	17
US Billboard 200	6
Chart (1999)	Position
Australian Albums (ARIA)	54
US Billboard 200	87
Chart (2002)	Position
Canadian Alternative Albums (Nielsen SoundScan)	191

=== Decade-end charts ===
Decade-end chart performance for Yourself or Someone Like You
Chart (1990–1999)	Position
US Billboard 200	28

== Certifications ==
Certifications for Yourself or Someone Like You
Region	Certification	Certified units/sales
Australia (ARIA)	10× Platinum	700,000^{^}
Canada (Music Canada)	8× Platinum	800,000^{^}
New Zealand (RMNZ)	5× Platinum	75,000^{^}
United Kingdom (BPI)	Gold	100,000^{*}
United States (RIAA)	12× Platinum	12,000,000^{^}
^{*} Sales figures based on certification alone.^{^} Shipments figures based on certification alone.

== See also ==
- List of best-selling albums in Australia
- List of best-selling albums in the United States
