= How Far We've Come =

2007 single by Matchbox Twenty

Single by Matchbox Twenty

from the album Exile on Mainstream
- Released: September 4, 2007
- Recorded: 2007
- Genre: Alternative rock
- Length: 3:29
- Label: Atlantic
- Songwriters: Rob Thomas, Paul Doucette, Kyle Cook, Brian Yale
- Producer: Steve Lillywhite

Matchbox Twenty singles chronology
"All I Need" (2004)	"How Far We've Come" (2007)	"These Hard Times" (2008)

Matchbox Twenty Australian singles chronology
"All I Need" (2004)	"How Far We've Come" (2007)	"All Your Reasons" (2008)

"How Far We've Come" is a song by American alternative rock group Matchbox Twenty. It was released in September 2007 as the lead single from their retrospective collection, Exile on Mainstream, which was released on October 2, 2007. The music video premiered on VH1's Top 20 Countdown on September 1, 2007. The CD single comes with two live covers as B-sides; "Remedy" by The Black Crowes and "Modern Love" by David Bowie. These two songs are also on the Best Buy version of Exile on Mainstream.

The Phonographic Performance Company of Australia announced that "How Far We've Come" was the most played recording in Australia in 2008. The PPCA also announced that Matchbox Twenty was the third most played artist in 2008.

== Track listing ==
EP version

1. "How Far We've Come" (radio edit) – 3:31
2. "Remedy" (live) – 4:31
3. "Modern Love" (live) – 3:51

== Personnel ==
- Rob Thomas - lead vocals, acoustic guitar, piano
- Kyle Cook - lead guitar, mandolin, backing vocals
- Paul Doucette - rhythm guitar, backing vocals
- Brian Yale - bass
- Ryan MacMillan - drums

== Chart performance ==
The single debuted at #93 on the U.S. Billboard Hot 100, but after being released digitally, it jumped to #12, making it the second-biggest jump of 2007 behind Beyoncé and Shakira's "Beautiful Liar" (which jumped 91 spots). It peaked at #11 on the U.S. Billboard Hot 100. It also reached #3 on the U.S. Adult Top 40. On the Australian ARIA Singles Chart it debuted at #8, becoming their most successful single in Australia since the band's 1997 breakout hit "Push". It later rose to #7 there, becoming the band's highest-charting single there. In Canada it reached the top five, and it peaked at #11 in New Zealand.

=== Charts ===
Chart (2007–2008)	Peak position
Australia (ARIA)	7
Canada Hot 100 (Billboard)	4
Canada CHR/Top 40 (Billboard)	27
Canada Hot AC (Billboard)	1
Germany (GfK)	60
Hungary (Rádiós Top 40)	3
New Zealand (Recorded Music NZ)	11
UK Singles (OCC)	157
US Billboard Hot 100	11
US Adult Alternative Airplay (Billboard)	10
US Adult Contemporary (Billboard)	22
US Adult Pop Airplay (Billboard)	3
US Dance Club Songs (Billboard)	8
US Pop Airplay (Billboard)	14

=== Year-end charts ===
Chart (2007)	Position
Australia (ARIA)	24
US Adult Top 40 (Billboard)	19
Chart (2008)	Position
Australia (ARIA)	85
US Adult Top 40 (Billboard)	32
Chart (2009)	Position
Hungary (Rádiós Top 40)	132

== Certifications ==
Region	Certification	Certified units/sales
Australia (ARIA)	2× Platinum	140,000^{‡}
New Zealand (RMNZ)	Platinum	30,000^{‡}
United States (RIAA)	3× Platinum	3,000,000^{‡}
^{‡} Sales+streaming figures based on certification alone.

== Music video ==
The music video is a three-minute and twenty-six second montage of many historical events around the world during the late 20th Century, tying in with the lyrics on human affairs and its role in cultural development. The video debuted on VH1 Top 20 Video Countdown on September 1, 2007. It contains many important events that changed the world in a roughly chronological order. The events are:

- Scenes from the civil rights movement (1950s)
- September 11 on the WTC (2001)
- John F. Kennedy's assassination (1963)
- Muhammad Ali winning the rematch against Sonny Liston in the first round (1965)
- Woodstock (1969)
- Women marching for equal rights (1970s)
- Pelé in a soccer match
- The tearing down of the Berlin Wall (1989)
- Tank Man during the Tiananmen Square protests of 1989
- Early personal computers on an assembly line (1970s, 1980s)
- Live Aid (1985)
- New Year's celebrations across the world at the beginning of the 21st century (including Egypt, Paris) (2000)
- Death of Princess Diana in Paris (1997)
- The Oslo Accords (1993)
- Live Earth including Al Gore (2007)
- Barack Obama and Hillary Clinton, Democratic candidates for the 2008 United States presidential primaries

The video ends with many of the clips flashing quickly across the screen in reverse order at the end of the song.
