= North (Matchbox Twenty album) =

Studio album by Matchbox Twenty
- Released: August 28, 2012
- Recorded: Mid-2011
- Genre: Pop rock; alternative rock
- Length: 42:24
- Label: Atlantic
- Producer: Matt Serletic

Matchbox Twenty chronology
Exile on Mainstream (2007)	North (2012)	Where the Light Goes (2023)

Singles from North
- 1. "She's So Mean" Released: June 12, 2012; 2. "Overjoyed" Released: August 28, 2012; 3. "Our Song" Released: April 13, 2013

Professional ratings
Aggregate scores
Source	Rating
Metacritic	57/100
Review scores
Source	Rating
AllMusic	4/5 stars
American Songwriter	2/5 stars
Consequence of Sound	F
Newsday	B−
PopMatters	5/10
Q	1/5 stars
Rolling Stone	3/5 stars
USA Today	2/4 stars

North is the fourth studio album by American rock band Matchbox Twenty. It was released on August 28, 2012, in Australia and September 4, 2012, through Atlantic Records worldwide. It is the first album from the band to debut at No. 1 on the Billboard 200, selling 95,000 copies in its first week. It is also the first album of all new material that the band has released since More Than You Think You Are in 2002, although they recorded six new songs for their 2007 compilation album Exile on Mainstream. It is also their first full-length studio album since rhythm guitarist Adam Gaynor's departure from the band in 2005, as well as their last album produced by longtime producer Matt Serletic.

== Background and recording ==
In 2004, rhythm guitarist Adam Gaynor left the band. The group then went on hiatus, with the future of the band uncertain. In 2007, the remaining four group members reunited to do a compilation album, and ended up recording seven new songs over the course of one session. For the first time, every member of the group worked on songwriting. After the compilation album was released, the group parted ways again on another hiatus, the group's future still uncertain. Many of Rob Thomas's confidantes urged him to leave the band and focus on his burgeoning solo career, but Thomas did not want to give up on the band and started writing songs intended for the group's next album. Finally, on September 4, 2010, while on VH1's Top 20 Music Video Countdown, Thomas stated that Matchbox Twenty was planning to start working on their next studio album in mid-September of that year.

Due to the band members living in different locations, their first recording sessions took place in New York City, Los Angeles, and Nashville where Rob Thomas, Paul Doucette, and Kyle Cook were living, respectively. As a result of the different recording environments, the group amassed a large amount of new material of various styles which could have become multiple albums. The group had about 60 songs to choose from when they all met up in Nashville and shared a house over a three-month period during the summer of 2011. The group worked on creating a short list of songs for the album, but it was a stressful process, as the group members disagreed on which musical direction the new album should take.

For three months, they argued and drank, in what Thomas described as a "$100,000 bender". One of the major factors that encouraged the group to finally move forward was a visit from record producer Matt Serletic, who they had not worked with since 2002's More Than You Think You Are. The group decided to have Serletic produce the album. Regarding Serletic's return, Paul Doucette stated: "It sort of became evident that bringing someone new to the table was maybe not the best idea. We have such a great shorthand with Matt, it was sort of like, 'What are we waiting for?'" Once they started recording the album at Serletic's Emblem Studios in Calabasas, California, they had narrowed down to about 20 songs. For the first time, the band recorded several songs written solely by Doucette, Cook, and Brian Yale.

The final album was cut down to 12 songs and was primarily recorded at Emblem Studios with additional recording at Electric Lady Studios, Studio Eleven:17, Sweatshop Studios, and Dark Horse Recording Studio. Five bonus tracks were also recorded for the album. Regarding the album's title, Doucette told Rolling Stone: "The title refers to us finding our way. We went into this record with a lot of material. Many different songs that could have taken us in many different directions. It sort of overwhelmed us for a bit. But, at a certain point, we figured it out. We figured out where 'North' was."

== Release ==
The lead single from the album, "She's So Mean", was released on June 12, 2012. A promotional video for the second single, "Overjoyed", was released on August 28, 2012. The third single, "Our Song", was released on April 13, 2013.

== Promotion ==
In 2012, the band embarked on a worldwide tour, the North Tour, to promote the album. The 2013 Summer Tour co-headlining tour with Goo Goo Dolls later took the band through the United States and Canada.

== Commercial performance ==
North became the band's first album to debut at number one on the US Billboard 200, selling 95,000 copies in its first week. It was certified gold by the Recording Industry Association of America on June 22, 2016. The album also reached number one in Australia, making it Matchbox Twenty's fourth album to top the chart there, and was later certified platinum by the Australian Recording Industry Association.

== Track listing ==
All tracks are written by Rob Thomas, except where noted.

No.	Title	Writer(s)	Length
1.	"Parade"		4:09
2.	"She's So Mean"	Thomas; Kyle Cook; Paul Doucette	3:50
3.	"Overjoyed"	Thomas; Cook; Doucette	3:07
4.	"Put Your Hands Up"		2:52
5.	"Our Song"		3:01
6.	"I Will"	Thomas; Cook; Doucette	4:03
7.	"English Town"	Doucette	4:37
8.	"How Long"	Cook	2:44
9.	"Radio"	Thomas; Doucette	3:02
10.	"The Way"	Cook; Doucette	3:17
11.	"Like Sugar"		3:46
12.	"Sleeping at the Wheel"		3:50
Total length:			42:24

Target exclusive bonus tracks
No.	Title	Writer(s)	Length
13.	"Waiting on a Train"		2:59
14.	"I Don't Wanna Be Loved"	Thomas; Cook; Doucette	3:34

Deluxe edition bonus tracks
No.	Title	Writer(s)	Length
13.	"I Believe in Everything"	Thomas; Cook; Doucette	3:39
14.	"Straight for This Life"	Thomas; Cook; Doucette	3:16
15.	"Waiting on a Train"		2:59

Japanese version bonus tracks
No.	Title	Writer(s)	Length
13.	"I Believe in Everything"	Thomas; Cook; Doucette	3:39
14.	"Straight for This Life"	Thomas; Cook; Doucette	3:16
15.	"Help Me Through This"	Thomas; Cook; Doucette	3:34
16.	"I Don't Wanna Be Loved"	Thomas; Cook; Doucette	3:34

== Personnel ==
Matchbox Twenty

- Rob Thomas – lead vocals, rhythm guitar, keyboards
- Kyle Cook – lead guitar, backing vocals, lead vocals on "The Way"
- Paul Doucette – drums, rhythm guitar, backing vocals
- Brian Yale – bass guitar

Orchestra

- Jeffrey Babko – trombone on "English Town", "Radio"
- Glen Berger – baritone saxophone on "Radio"
- Brian Dembow – viola on "Parade", "I Will", "English Town"
- Steve Erdody – cello on "Parade", "I Will", "English Town"
- Walter Fowler – trumpet on "English Town", "Radio"
- Julie Gigante – violin on "Parade", "I Will", "English Town"
- Glenn Morisette – alto saxophone, tenor saxophone on "Radio"
- Lee Thornburg – trumpet on "English Town", "Radio"
- Roger Wilkie – violin on "Parade", "I Will", "English Town"

Production

- Alex Arias – assistant engineering, additional engineering, additional programming, Pro Tools
- Keith Armstrong – mixing assistant
- James Brown – engineering
- Mark Dobson – additional engineering
- Ryan Hewitt – engineering
- Ted Jensen – mastering
- Nik Karpen – mixing assistant
- Ryan Kern – assistant engineering, Pro Tools
- Derik Lee – additional engineering
- Mike Leisz – assistant engineering, additional programming, Pro Tools
- Chris Lord-Alge – mixing
- Nigel Lundemo – Pro Tools
- Jim Monti – Pro Tools
- Eryk Rich – assistant engineering
- Andrew Schubert – additional mixing assistant
- Matt Serletic – production, additional synths, programming, percussion
- Brad Townsend – additional mixing assistant
- Doug Trantow – additional engineering

== Charts ==
=== Weekly charts ===
Weekly chart performance for North
Chart (2012)	Peak position
Australian Albums (ARIA)	1
Austrian Albums (Ö3 Austria)	9
Belgian Albums (Ultratop Flanders)	159
Canadian Albums (Billboard)	2
Dutch Albums (Album Top 100)	45
German Albums (Offizielle Top 100)	13
Irish Albums (IRMA)	19
Japanese Albums (Oricon)	156
New Zealand Albums (RMNZ)	6
Scottish Albums (OCC)	11
Spanish Albums (Promusicae)	61
Swiss Albums (Schweizer Hitparade)	25
UK Albums (OCC)	14
US Billboard 200	1
US Top Rock Albums (Billboard)	1

=== Year-end charts ===
2012 year-end chart performance for North
Chart (2012)	Position
Australian Albums (ARIA)	26
US Billboard 200	144
US Top Rock Albums (Billboard)	41

== Certifications ==
Certifications for North
Region	Certification	Certified units/sales
Australia (ARIA)	Platinum	70,000^{^}
United States (RIAA)	Gold	500,000^{^}
^{^} Shipments figures based on certification alone.
