= 3AM (Matchbox Twenty song) =

1997 single by Matchbox Twenty

Single by Matchbox 20

from the album Yourself or Someone Like You
- B-side: "Push" (acoustic); "Shame"
- Released: October 6, 1997
- Studio: Triclops (Atlanta, Georgia)
- Length: 3:46
- Label: Atlantic; Lava; Melisma
- Composers: John Leslie Goff; John Joseph Stanley; Rob Thomas; Brian Yale
- Lyricist: Rob Thomas
- Producer: Matt Serletic

Matchbox 20 singles chronology
"Push" (1997)	"3AM" (1997)	"Real World" (1998)

Music video
- "3AM" on YouTube

"3AM" (stylized as "3 am" on the album and "3 AM" on the single) is the third single and the third track from American rock band Matchbox 20's debut album, Yourself or Someone Like You (1996). Written by Rob Thomas, Jay Stanley, John Leslie Goff, and Brian Yale, the song was inspired by Thomas dealing with his mother's cancer as a teenager. The song was officially serviced to US modern rock radio in October 1997 and was given a commercial release outside North America the following month.

"3AM" topped the Canadian RPM 100 Hit Tracks chart for two weeks and peaked at number three on the US Billboard Hot 100 Airplay chart; it was not eligible to chart on the Billboard Hot 100 at the time due to not receiving a physical release in the United States. Outside North America, "3AM" reached number 31 in Australia and became a minor hit in Europe. A music video was also made for the song, directed by Gavin Bowden and filmed in Los Angeles.

== Background and content ==
"3AM" was written by Rob Thomas, Jay Stanley, John Leslie Goff, and Brian Yale while performing together in the early 1990s band Tabitha's Secret. The song was first recorded by that band on its debut EP, Tabitha's Secret?. The lyrics are inspired by Thomas as an adolescent having to live with a mother fighting to survive cancer. In 1997, after the other members of Tabitha's Secret left to form Matchbox 20, Goff and Stanley released other early recordings of the band, including "3 AM", on Don't Play with Matches.

== Music video ==
The song's music video, directed by Gavin Bowden, was shot in Los Angeles. It features the band sitting on sides of a street next to some telephone booths. A supermarket is also shown. The video switches between color video clips and black-and-white still images. During the introduction and the third verse of the song, Thomas walks in the middle of the street with some construction signs and lights. During the third verse, a Pontiac Trans Am with a bare-chested man and a woman inside stops in front of Thomas. The man gets out, revealing a catheter in his chest, takes three cigarettes from pack of cigarettes and gives Thomas rest of the pack of cigarettes and then gets back in the Trans Am. Finally, during the last two choruses, the band is shown playing their instruments (presumably in the lobby of a hotel or office building) as rain can be seen falling from a large window behind them. The video ends with an image of Thomas standing next to the telephone booths.

== Track listings ==
Australian and UK CD single

1. "3 AM" – 3:46
2. "Push" (acoustic) – 4:19
3. "Shame" – 3:35

UK 7-inch and cassette single; European CD single

1. "3 AM" – 3:46
2. "Push" (acoustic) – 4:19

== Credits and personnel ==
Credits are taken from the Yourself or Someone Like You liner notes.

Studios

- Recorded at Triclops Recording (Atlanta, Georgia)
- Mixed at House of Blues Studios (Memphis, Tennessee)
- Mastered at Precision Mastering (Los Angeles)

Matchbox 20

- Rob Thomas – music, lyrics, vocals
- Kyle Cook – backing vocals, lead guitar
- Adam Gaynor – backing vocals, rhythm guitar
- Brian Yale – music, bass guitar
- Paul Doucette – drums

Others

- John Leslie Goff – music
- John Joseph Stanley – music
- Jan Smith – vocal coach
- Tony Adams – guitar tech
- Matt Serletic – keyboards, percussion, production, mixing
- Craig Poole – drum tech
- John Nielsen – recording assistance
- Greg Archilla – mixing
- Malcolm Springer – mixing assistance
- Jeff Tomei – engineering
- Don C. Tyler – digital editing
- Stephen Marcussen – mastering

== Charts ==
=== Weekly charts ===
Chart (1997–1998)	Peak position
Australia (ARIA)	31
Canada Top Singles (RPM)	1
Canada Adult Contemporary (RPM)	20
Canada Rock/Alternative (RPM)	1
Germany (GfK)	96
Netherlands (Single Top 100)	92
Poland Airplay (Music & Media)	20
Quebec (ADISQ)	21
Scottish Singles Sales (Official Charts)	57
Spain Airplay (Music & Media)	5
UK Singles (Official Charts)	64
US Radio Songs (Billboard)	3
US Adult Alternative Airplay (Billboard)	1
US Adult Contemporary (Billboard)	3
US Adult Pop Airplay (Billboard)	1
US Alternative Airplay (Billboard)	3
US Mainstream Rock Airplay (Billboard)	2
US Pop Airplay (Billboard)	2

=== Year-end charts ===
Chart (1997)	Position
US Modern Rock Tracks (Billboard)	91

Chart (1998)	Position
Canada Top Singles (RPM)	5
Canada Adult Contemporary (RPM)	57
Canada Rock/Alternative (RPM)	11
US Hot 100 Airplay (Billboard)	3
US Adult Top 40 (Billboard)	2
US Mainstream Rock Tracks (Billboard)	13
US Mainstream Top 40 (Billboard)	4
US Modern Rock Tracks (Billboard)	23
US Triple-A (Billboard)	1

== Certifications ==
Region	Certification	Certified units/sales
Australia (ARIA)	4× Platinum	280,000^{‡}
New Zealand (RMNZ)	3× Platinum	90,000^{‡}
United States (RIAA)	5× Platinum	5,000,000^{‡}
^{‡} Sales+streaming figures based on certification alone.

== Release history ==
Region	Date	Format(s)	Label(s)	Ref.
United States	October 6, 1997	Modern rock radio	Atlantic; Lava; Melisma	
Australia	November 23, 1997	CD	Atlantic; Lava; Melisma	
United Kingdom	June 22, 1998	CD; cassette	Atlantic; Lava; Melisma	

== See also ==
- List of RPM Rock/Alternative number-one singles (Canada)
