= Overjoyed (Matchbox Twenty song) =

2012 single by Matchbox Twenty

Single by Matchbox Twenty

from the album North
- Released: August 28, 2012
- Genre: Alternative rock
- Length: 3:06
- Label: Atlantic
- Songwriters: Rob Thomas, Kyle Cook, Paul Doucette

Matchbox Twenty singles chronology
"She's So Mean" (2012)	"Overjoyed" (2012)	"Our Song" (2012)

Music video
- "Overjoyed" on YouTube

"Overjoyed" is a song by American alternative rock band Matchbox Twenty. It was released on August 28, 2012, as the second single from their fourth studio album, North. A music video was released for "Overjoyed" on November 2, 2012.

== Music video ==
The official music video was uploaded to YouTube on November 2, 2012, and was directed by Big TV. The music video shows Rob Thomas and the rest of the band performing the song at a fair. In the beginning, you see a young woman getting ready and an older woman also putting on make up. They both meet their "date" at a fair. Throughout the video, you see couples from various time periods enjoy the merry-go-round, games, and go-karts. The couples get their pictures taken, and the ending shows that this is the same couple from different periods ranging from 1959 to 2012.

== Charts ==
Chart (2013)	Peak position
Canada AC (Billboard)	27
US Adult Pop Airplay (Billboard)	16
