= Brandon Blue Hamilton =

Music producer

- Also known as: Blue
- Born: Brandon Hamilton; April 7, 1987 (age 39); St. Louis, Missouri U.S.
- Origin: Atlanta, Georgia, U.S.
- Occupations: Record producer, songwriter, performer, teacher
- Instruments: Bass, guitar, drums, piano
- Years active: 2010–present
- Labels: Plumbline Music Group, Island Def Jam
- Website: bassieblue.com

Brandon Hamilton (born 1987), professionally known as Blue, is a Grammy Award nominated American record producer from Atlanta. He is most known for his work with Plumbline Music Group, which he joined in January 2010. He is signed with Plumbline Music Group, a music production company started by Jan Smith. He has worked with Smith on the production of the Grammy-nominated song written by Diane Warren for Justin Bieber entitled "Born To Be Somebody".

It also earned Blue production credit on the film, Justin Bieber: Never Say Never and was the only new release from the movie's soundtrack CD. Blue co-wrote a song with Bieber, "All I Want is You" for the 2011 Christmas album, Under The Mistletoe. In June 2012, Blue was on the cover and named Atlanta's Hottest New Producer and one to watch for in X-Poszed magazine.

== Production and writing credits ==
Justin Bieber - Under the Mistletoe (November 1, 2011)

- "All I Want Is You"

Produced By Bieber, written By Bieber and Brandon Blue Hamilton

Justin Bieber - Never Say Never: The Remixes (February 14, 2011)

- "Born to Be Somebody" - from the film, Justin Bieber: Never Say Never. A Grammy Award nominated song.

Produced By Brandon Blue Hamilton and Jan Smith, written by Dianne Warren

Myron Butler & Levi - Stronger (August 28, 2007) (Guitar and additional instruments – Brandon Blue Hamilton)

== Personal life ==
Despite widespread confusion, the Atlanta-based African-American record producer, Brandon "Blue" Hamilton, is not the same individual as a white musician named Blue Hamilton from Los Angeles, who is married to actor Matt Dallas.
