= She's So Mean =

2012 single by Matchbox Twenty

Single by Matchbox Twenty

from the album North
- B-side: "Help Me Through This"; "I Don't Wanna Be Loved"
- Released: June 12, 2012
- Recorded: 2011
- Genre: Pop rock; power pop
- Length: 3:50
- Label: Atlantic
- Songwriters: Rob Thomas; Kyle Cook; Paul Doucette
- Producer: Matt Serletic

Matchbox Twenty singles chronology
"These Hard Times" (2008)	"She's So Mean" (2012)	"Overjoyed" (2012)

Music video
- "She's So Mean" on YouTube

"She's So Mean" is a song by American rock band Matchbox Twenty. It was released on June 12, 2012, as the first single from their fourth studio album North (2012). The song received generally favorable reviews from music critics, who complimented its fun content and catchiness. The song performed moderately well on the charts, peaking inside the top 20 in Austria and New Zealand and the top 40 in Australia, Canada, and the United States. A music video was released for the song on July 30, 2012.

== Background and release ==
After a decade without releasing a new studio album, the band gathered to work on a full-length studio album, since their compilation Exile on Mainstream, released in 2007, featured seven new songs. Its vocalist, Rob Thomas, stated that, "It could sound like the Kinks, it could sound like Maroon 5, but follow that thread, follow it all the way through." The two-year writing and recording sessions (started in 2010 and ended in 2012) led to over 60 ideas that longtime producer Matt Serletic helped the group chop down to the 12 songs that made North. Among the 12 tracks, "She's so Mean" was included. Speaking to Artist Direct, Matchbox Twenty drummer Paul Doucette commented,

"This one came out of a simple chord progression. We had to write an entire song over this chord progression. Everyone would come up with a section. The basic melodic structure was written in a few minutes. We were fairly drunk at the time [Laughs]. We were recording everything we were doing. We traded off singing different melodies over it. It's pretty funny to listen to, I have to say."

Thomas says the song's about "the wrong kind of girls that we've probably all dated," though as a band of mostly married men for the last decade, they turned to other sources of inspiration. "Luckily, you have single friends who are making really bad decisions, so you can draw on their experiences," he laughed.

"She's So Mean" was released as North's lead-single on June 12, 2012, while an EP featuring 3 remixes was released on August 1, 2012.

== Composition ==
"She's So Mean" was written by Matchbox Twenty members, Rob Thomas, Kyle Cook and Paul Doucette, while production was handled by Matt Serletic. It is a power pop song, with handclap intro and catchy guitar refrain. David Greenwald of Billboard Magazine commented that the song "recalls the band's late '90s early days," and that "With lyrics about a bad girl who "drinks Bacardi in the morning," it's ready to soundtrack a future 'Jersey Shore' episode, or at least a summer at the beach." For Melinda Newman of HitFix opined, "The song is redolent of ‘70s power pop—that territory that Fountains of Wayne has mined so successfully — yet it never sounds overly retro."

Lyrically, it talks about wanting something that's not good for you. According to the band, it can be interpreted in two ways; a guy wanting a girl who's not nice to him or wanting things that are bad for you, not knowing they're bad for you, and saying, 'I still want it'." “Every now and then she makes you a little bit crazy/she’ll insert a knife in your back and then she’s calling you baby," Thomas sings. For Paul Doucette, "'She's So Mean' is more lighthearted and tongue-in-cheek than we usually do because we haven't done that yet."

== Critical reception ==
"She's So Mean" received generally favorable reviews from music critics. Melinda Newman of HitFix was positive, calling it "an ear worm waiting to invade your brain and not let go for the rest of the year." She also complimented the production, calling it "deceptively simple, but each drumbeat, every little yelp by Rob Thomas, only makes the song more seductive." Glenn Gamboa of Newsday wrote that the song "works, picking up the pace, adding some snark and turning up the drums in the mix so they're almost dueling with Thomas' vocals." James Hunter of Rolling Stone named it "a droll look at addiction and a master class in snappiness."

While reviewing the album, Steve Lapore of PopMatters was mixed, writing that the song "sounds like Matchbox Twenty are trying to teach young whippersnappers like Adam Levine a thing or two about this hit-makin’ business. The problem is, sadly, that they can't and don't. They sound uncomfortable and too old to be singing about an 'uptown/downtown/anything-goes-girl'."

== Chart performance ==
In the United States, the song debuted at number 91 on the Billboard Hot 100 chart week of June 30, 2012. It fell off the chart the following week, but re-entered at number 90 on the week of July 21, 2012. After climbing for weeks, the song peaked at number 40, in its tenth week, on the chart issue dated September 15, 2012. In Canada, the single proved to be even more successful, debuting at number 61 on the Canadian Hot 100 chart week of June 30, 2012, and peaking at number 31, on the week of September 15, 2012. In Austria, the single debuted at number 65 on the Ö3 Austria Top 40 chart, on the week of August 31, 2012, and peaked at number 19, on the week of September 21, 2012.

"She's So Mean" debuted on the Australian ARIA Charts at number 48, on the week of July 1, 2012. Later, the song climbed to number 36. After weeks of rises and falls, the song peaked at number 26, on the week of August 12, 2012, remaining at the peak position for another week. After two weeks of falling, the song climbed again to number 26. The song spent 20 weeks on the Aria Charts and was certified Platinum by the Australian Recording Industry Association (ARIA) for selling more than 70,000 units of the song. The song performed well on the New Zealand Singles Chart, debuting at number 39, on the week of July 16, 2012. It re-entered at number 35 on the week of July 30, 2012, while in its third week, it jumped to number 29, remaining for two further weeks at the same position. The song kept climbing for two weeks, before peaking at number 19, on the week of September 10, 2012.

== Music video ==
The official music video was uploaded to YouTube on July 31, 2012. It features the band singing while a beautiful woman (Danish model and actress Stephanie Corneliussen) walks in and causes mayhem. She is seen constantly teasing the band with their equipment. She discovers firecrackers, an old Mason jar filled with moonshine, and vinyl records. Soon, she opens the jar, smells it and drinks it. She starts throwing the records, but the band dodges the records. She finds firecrackers, lights it and throws it towards the band. She rides a bicycle, before crashing it into Paul Doucette's drum kit. Later, she rips wires out of the circuit breaker, causing the lights to flicker and sparks. She then pours coffee on the mixing console, causing more sparks. She finds matches and lights one, before she discards it throwing it towards Paul's drums setting the kit on fire. She then grabs a fire extinguisher and sprays it at the band. As of April 2024, it has over 37 million views.

== Charts ==
=== Weekly charts ===
Chart (2012)	Peak position
Australia (ARIA)	26
Austria (Ö3 Austria Top 40)	19
Belgium (Ultratip Bubbling Under Flanders)	38
Canada Hot 100 (Billboard)	31
Canada AC (Billboard)	24
Canada Hot AC (Billboard)	11
Japan Hot 100 (Billboard)	42
New Zealand (Recorded Music NZ)	19
South Korea (Gaon International Chart)	35
US Billboard Hot 100	40
US Adult Alternative Airplay (Billboard)	21
US Adult Contemporary (Billboard)	15
US Adult Pop Airplay (Billboard)	6
US Dance Club Songs (Billboard)	5
US Pop Airplay (Billboard)	31

=== Year-end charts ===
Chart (2012)	Position
US Adult Contemporary (Billboard)	39
US Adult Top 40 (Billboard)	30

== Certifications ==
Region	Certification	Certified units/sales
Australia (ARIA)	3× Platinum	210,000^{‡}
Canada (Music Canada)	Gold	40,000^{*}
United States (RIAA)	Platinum	1,000,000^{‡}
^{*} Sales figures based on certification alone.^{‡} Sales+streaming figures based on certification alone.
