= The Break and Repair Method =

- Genres: Pop, rock
- Years active: 2008
- Label: Bluhammock

The Break and Repair Method is the side project of Matchbox Twenty drummer and rhythm guitarist Paul Doucette. Doucette put the band together when Matchbox Twenty was on hiatus, and when all the band's members were unsure whether their band would reunite. He has said he started The Break and Repair Method as an "experiment" to find out what he sounds like out on his own, as opposed to performing in a band where he was not a songwriter, as he did with Matchbox Twenty. Their debut album Milk the Bee was released on September 16, 2008. The group toured with Matt Nathanson in support of the album.
