= Push (Matchbox Twenty song) =

1997 single by Matchbox Twenty

Single by Matchbox Twenty

from the album Yourself or Someone Like You
- B-side: "Tired"
- Released: June 10, 1997
- Studio: Triclops (Atlanta, Georgia)
- Genre: Alternative rock
- Length: 3:59
- Label: Atlantic; Lava; Melisma
- Songwriters: Rob Thomas; Matt Serletic
- Producer: Matt Serletic

Matchbox Twenty singles chronology
| "Long Day" (1996) | "Push" (1997) | "3AM" (1997) |

Music video
- "Push" on YouTube

"Push" is a song by American rock band Matchbox Twenty. It was released in 1997 as the second single from their debut album, Yourself or Someone Like You (1996). After landing "Long Day" on several rock radio stations paving the way, "Push" topped the US Modern Rock Tracks chart and became one of the band's signature songs.

== Composition ==
Vocalist Rob Thomas wrote the lyrics to "Push" with Matt Serletic. The song's lyrics are about the stress of falling in and out of love. Thomas stated that the man in the song (either himself or fictional) was the one being abused, either emotionally or physically, by a woman. After its release, the song's lyrics drew criticism from some listeners who interpreted them as promoting violence against women, to which Thomas expressed surprise, stating that the song was not misogynistic. In an interview with The Morning Call, bass guitarist Brian Yale added, "We were kind of surprised when we heard all that stuff. [Our response] was, 'Wow, really? No, it's not about that.'"

== Music video ==
The video for "Push" was directed by Nigel Dick, and shot March 27–28, 1997, in Los Angeles. The video starts and ends with Rob Thomas playing with a puppet. Throughout the song, the band is seen playing in an alley. A couple of scenes feature Thomas chained to a wall. Another scene is of Thomas holding onto a barbed wire fence while the band stands in the background. He gets stuck by the fence but keeps putting his hands back on it. Thomas is also seen in a room containing a clock and a bed, though no windows are shown.

== Track listings and formats ==
- 12-inch vinyl, cassette, and CD single
1. "Push" – 3:59
2. "Tired" – 3:44
- Maxi-single
1. "Push" – 3:59
2. "Busted" (acoustic) – 4:24
3. "Tired" – 3:44

== Credits and personnel ==
Credits and personnel are adapted from the Yourself or Someone Like You album liner notes.

Studios

- Recorded at Triclops Recording (Atlanta, Georgia)
- Mixed at House of Blues Studios (Memphis, Tennessee)
- Mastered at Precision Mastering (Los Angeles)

Matchbox 20

- Rob Thomas – writing, vocals
- Kyle Cook – backing vocals, lead guitar
- Adam Gaynor – backing vocals, rhythm guitar
- Brian Yale – bass guitar
- Paul Doucette – drums

Others

- Matt Serletic – writing, keyboards, percussion, production, mixing
- Jan Smith – vocal coach
- Tony Adams – guitar tech
- Craig Poole – drum tech
- John Nielsen – recording assistance
- Greg Archilla – mixing
- Malcolm Springer – mixing assistance
- Jeff Tomei – engineering
- Don C. Tyler – digital editing
- Stephen Marcussen – mastering

== Charts ==
=== Weekly charts ===
1997–1998 weekly chart performance for "Push"
| Chart (1997–1998) | Peak position |
|---|---|
| Australia (ARIA) | 8 |
| Australia Alternative (ARIA) | 1 |
| Canada Top Singles (RPM) | 6 |
| Canada Adult Contemporary (RPM) | 38 |
| Canada Rock/Alternative (RPM) | 4 |
| Germany (GfK) | 91 |
| Netherlands (Dutch Top 40 Tipparade) | 14 |
| Netherlands (Single Top 100) | 61 |
| Scottish Singles Sales (Official Charts) | 30 |
| Spain Airplay (Music & Media) | 5 |
| UK Singles (Official Charts) | 38 |
| US Radio Songs (Billboard) | 5 |
| US Adult Alternative Airplay (Billboard) | 2 |
| US Adult Pop Airplay (Billboard) | 6 |
| US Alternative Airplay (Billboard) | 1 |
| US Mainstream Rock Airplay (Billboard) | 4 |
| US Pop Airplay (Billboard) | 3 |

2023 weekly chart performance for "Push"
| Chart (2023) | Peak position |
|---|---|
| US Digital Song Sales (Billboard) | 49 |
| US Hot Rock & Alternative Songs (Billboard) | 17 |

=== Year-end charts ===
1997 year-end chart performance for "Push"
| Chart (1997) | Position |
|---|---|
| Australia (ARIA) | 33 |
| Canada Top Singles (RPM) | 33 |
| Canada Adult Contemporary (RPM) | 65 |
| Canada Rock/Alternative (RPM) | 24 |
| US Hot 100 Airplay (Billboard) | 21 |
| US Adult Top 40 (Billboard) | 24 |
| US Mainstream Rock Tracks (Billboard) | 4 |
| US Modern Rock Tracks (Billboard) | 5 |
| US Top 40/Mainstream (Billboard) | 21 |
| US Triple-A (Billboard) | 7 |

1998 year-end chart performance for "Push"
| Chart (1998) | Position |
|---|---|
| US Hot 100 Airplay (Billboard) | 36 |
| US Adult Top 40 (Billboard) | 51 |
| US Mainstream Top 40 (Billboard) | 52 |

== Certifications ==
Certifications for "Push"
| Region | Certification | Certified units/sales |
|---|---|---|
| Australia (ARIA) | 5× Platinum | 350,000^{‡} |
| New Zealand (RMNZ) | 3× Platinum | 90,000^{‡} |
| United States (RIAA) | 5× Platinum | 5,000,000^{‡} |
^{‡} Sales+streaming figures based on certification alone.

== Release history ==
Release dates and formats for "Push"
| Region | Date | Format(s) | Label(s) | Ref. |
|---|---|---|---|---|
| United States | 1997 | Rock radio | Atlantic; Lava; Melisma | |
| United States | June 10, 1997 | Contemporary hit radio | Atlantic; Lava; Melisma | |
| Europe | October 20, 1997 | CD | Atlantic; Lava; Melisma | |
| Japan | November 15, 1997 | CD | Atlantic; Lava; EastWest Japan | |
| United Kingdom | March 23, 1998 | CD; cassette | Atlantic; Lava; Melisma | |

== In popular culture ==
An extract of the song was used in the "Weird Al" Yankovic polka medley, "Polka Power!", along with many other popular songs of the late 90s, off the album Running with Scissors.

In the 2023 fantasy comedy Barbie, Ken (played by Ryan Gosling) adopts it as his favorite song after visiting the real world, and it becomes "a tongue-in-cheek anthem of patriarchal dominance" in Barbieland. While many reviews of the film interpreted this as a critique of the song, director Greta Gerwig said that she was a fan of Matchbox Twenty and "I never put anything in a movie I don’t love." Rob Thomas received a letter from Gerwig asking for permission, and he immediately cleared the inclusion of "Push", particularly liking how the description noted the Kens were "playing it at you instead of for you". However, Paul Doucette would note he was not as enthusiastic stating “I don’t know that everyone got the joke”, feeling "there was a large amount of people who maybe saw that we were now the voice of the patriarchy," comparing it to how Bring It On featured a Matchbox Twenty poster in the bedroom of the protagonist's unfaithful boyfriend. Gosling's cover of the song was included on Barbie the Album (Best Weekend Ever Edition).

== See also ==
- List of number-one alternative singles of 1997 (U.S.)
