= Mobile Roadie =

- Company type: Private
- Available in: Multilingual
- Founded: Los Angeles, California, U.S.
- Headquarters: Palo Alto, California, {{{location_country}}}
- Area served: Worldwide
- Founders: Michael Schneider; Brock Batten
- Employees: 35
- Website: mobileroadie.com
- Users: 35 million users
- Launched: March 2009; 17 years ago
- Current status: Active

Mobile Roadie is a self-service mobile app platform to create, customize and manage mobile apps.

== History ==
Mobile Roadie was founded in 2008 by Michael Schneider and Brock Batten, and officially launched at South by Southwest 2009. The first live app to be created using the Mobile Roadie platform was for the band Black Lips. As of June 2016, Mobile Roadie's app gallery includes Taylor Swift, Madonna, The Red Hot Chili Peppers, Rascal Flatts, Dallas Mavericks, Harvard University, Pacha Group, Spiderman: Turn Off the Dark, and Wicked.

On May 1, 2012, Mobile announced they added two new self-service products — iPad and Mobile Website. More than 20 million users have downloaded apps made by Mobile Roadie.

In March 2012, it was announced by Beggars Group Head of Marketing that Adele's official app passed 1.5 million downloads, the first Mobile Roadie app to pass the 1 million downloads mark.

In September 2011, Mobile Roadie announced they had surpassed 10 million app downloads and 2,000 mobile apps. In the same month, Mobile Roadie announced their launch in China as QMoBao (Chinese: “Q魔宝”) in partnership with FabriQate, a full-service mobile agency with offices in London, Hong Kong, Guangzhou, and Mumbai.

Mobile Roadie is headquartered in Palo Alto, CA, with presence in London, Oslo, Helsinki, Minsk, Kiev, Palo Alto, and New York. The company also has representatives in France, Spain, Australia, Italy, Germany, Brazil, and Turkey. Mobile Roadie was acquired by software development company Intellectsoft in October 2015 with Gino Padua taking over as CEO of Mobile Roadie.

== Features ==
Mobile Roadie offers mobile platforms for iOS and Android. They are created and managed through Mobile Roadie's Content Management System, which features a Dashboard to view app analytics and activity.

In November 2011, Mobile Roadie announced a new version of their platform called 3.3. There have been seven versions of Mobile Roadie prior to 3.3, including 1.0, 2.0, 2.1, 2.2, 3.0, 3.1, and 3.2. The Mobile Roadie app platform supports categories, including photo and video galleries, music streaming, event schedules, maps, and a Fan Wall with Twitter and Facebook integration.

In May 2012, Mobile Roadie introduced version 4.0. 4.0 includes iPad and Mobile Web, as well as a redesigned CMS.

In July 2013, Mobile Roadie introduced version 5.0 and version 5.6 is the latest as of June 2016 with features such as geofencing, pop-up promos, rewards systems, private in-app chat, points-based push notifications, photo cards, and polls

Mobile Roadie's API allows third-party developers to implement Mobile Roadie features in apps without using Mobile Roadie's CMS. The API also allows for website and app integration, so content in a Mobile Roadie app can be pulled from and pushed to a website.

== Recognition ==
Mobile Roadie was named one of Entrepreneur's 100 Brilliant Companies 2011, representing the category of Mobile.

Mobile Roadie won the B2B Digital Music Service of the Year Award at the Music Week Awards 2011.

The official Madonna app powered by Mobile Roadie won the FWA Mobile of the Day Award on April 25, 2012.

The official Adele app powered by Mobile Roadie was chosen as an Official Honoree at the 16th Annual Webby Awards in the Music category of "Mobile & Apps".

Mobile Roadie was honored as the Best Progressive Internet Marketing Company at the 2012 Internet Marketing Association Conference & Awards.

In 2016, the Arizona Department of Health Services IDAZ app powered by Mobile Roadie won a HEMMY Award from the Arizona Public Health Association.
