= If You're Gone (Matchbox Twenty song) =

2000 single by Matchbox Twenty

Single by Matchbox Twenty

from the album Mad Season
- Released: September 18, 2000
- Studio: Tree Sound (Atlanta, Georgia); East Iris (Nashville, Tennessee); Ocean Way (Nashville, Tennessee)
- Length: 4:34
- Label: Atlantic; Lava; Melisma
- Songwriter: Rob Thomas
- Producer: Matt Serletic

Matchbox Twenty singles chronology
"Bent" (2000)	"If You're Gone" (2000)	"Crutch" (2000)

"If You're Gone" is a song by American rock band Matchbox Twenty. The song, written by the band's frontman, Rob Thomas, was included on their second studio album, Mad Season (2000). In the United States, it was released alongside "Crutch" as the album's second and third single simultaneously on September 18, 2000—"If You're Gone" was sent to pop radio while "Crutch" was sent to rock formats. "If You're Gone" reached number five on the US Billboard Hot 100 chart and also became a hit on adult contemporary radio, spending two weeks at number one on the Billboard Adult Contemporary chart.

== Background and writing ==
Rob Thomas told Billboard magazine that he wrote the song right after he met his future wife. "We were separated for a few weeks and were on the phone all the time, and I was thinking, 'I met this wonderful person', and I wondered if everything I was going through [with Matchbox Twenty's success] was going to make it too crazy to build a relationship."

== Chart performance ==
In the United States, "If You're Gone" debuted at number 52 on the Billboard Hot 100 on the issue dated October 21, 2000. It began to rise up the chart, eventually reaching a peak of number five on January 27, 2001. As of 2026, it is tied with "Unwell" as the band's second-highest-charting single on the Hot 100, and it is also their second-longest-staying single (behind "Unwell"), remaining on the listing for 42 weeks. It was the sixth-most-successful single of 2001 in the US. On the Billboard Hot Adult Contemporary Tracks chart, it stayed at number one for two nonconsecutive weeks in 2001, and on the Adult Top 40 listing, it held the top spot for 13 issues, from December 13, 2000, to March 17, 2001. In Canada, the single peaked at number 27 on the RPM 100 Hit Tracks chart before the magazine ceased publication; because it was not released on a physical format in Canada, it did not appear on the Canadian Singles Chart.

Worldwide, the song found the most success in New Zealand. Despite peaking at number 12 on the RIANZ Singles Chart, it remained in the top 50 for 34 weeks between November 2000 and July 2001. At the end of 2001, it was ranked as New Zealand's 11th-best-performing song. On the Australian ARIA Singles Chart, the song first appeared at number 48 on October 29, 2000, and took 13 more weeks to reach its peak position of number 18. In Europe, "If You're Gone" was a top-40 hit in Ireland, where it reached number 36, but charted weakly elsewhere, peaking at number 50 in the United Kingdom, number 84 in Germany, and number 95 in the Netherlands. In 2019, the song experienced a resurgence of popularity in Japan, reaching number 84 on the Japan Hot 100.

== Music video ==
The music video for the song, directed by Pedro Romhanyi, is filmed completely in black and white and features only the band (along with two trumpet players and a trombone player), performing at night on the rooftop of a building in the central business district of downtown Los Angeles. Halfway through the video, Rob Thomas steps onto the edge of the roof and spreads his arms like he's going to jump. He doesn't; he turns around and goes back to where the band is playing. Near the end of the video, the sun dawns and illuminates the rooftop and surrounding buildings of the city.

== Track listings ==
UK CD single

1. "If You're Gone" (edit) – 4:21
2. "If You're Gone" (album version) – 4:33
3. "Bent" (live) – 4:36

European CD single

1. "If You're Gone" (edit) – 4:21
2. "Bent" (live) – 4:36

Australian maxi-CD single

1. "If You're Gone" (album version)
2. "Bent" (live)
3. "Back 2 Good" (live)

== Charts ==
=== Weekly charts ===
Chart (2000–2001)	Peak position
Australia (ARIA)	18
Canada CHR (Nielsen BDS)	2
Canada Top Singles (RPM)	27 (Note: "If You're Gone" reached number 27 when RPM ceased publication in November 2000.)
Canada Adult Contemporary (RPM)	37 (Note: "If You're Gone" reached number 37 when RPM ceased publication in November 2000.)
Croatia (HRT)	4
Germany (GfK)	84
Ireland (IRMA)	36
Netherlands (Dutch Top 40 Tipparade)	16
Netherlands (Single Top 100)	95
New Zealand (Recorded Music NZ)	12
Scottish Singles Sales (Official Charts)	43
UK Singles (Official Charts)	50
US Billboard Hot 100	5
US Adult Alternative Airplay (Billboard)	5
US Adult Contemporary (Billboard)	1
US Adult Pop Airplay (Billboard)	1
US Pop Airplay (Billboard)	4

Chart (2019)	Peak position
Japan Hot 100 (Billboard)	84

=== Year-end charts ===
Chart (2000)	Position
US Adult Top 40 (Billboard)	61
US Mainstream Top 40 (Billboard)	94

Chart (2001)	Position
Canada Radio (Nielsen BDS)	4
New Zealand (RIANZ)	11
US Billboard Hot 100	6
US Adult Contemporary (Billboard)	3
US Adult Top 40 (Billboard)	1
US Mainstream Top 40 (Billboard)	19
US Triple-A (Billboard)	27

Chart (2002)	Position
US Adult Contemporary (Billboard)	4

== Certifications ==
Region	Certification	Certified units/sales
Australia (ARIA)	2× Platinum	140,000^{‡}
New Zealand (RMNZ)	Platinum	30,000^{‡}
United States (RIAA)	2× Platinum	2,000,000^{‡}
^{‡} Sales+streaming figures based on certification alone.

== Release history ==
Region	Date	Format(s)	Label(s)	Ref(s).
Australia	September 2000	CD	Atlantic; Lava; Melisma	
United States	September 18, 2000	Hot adult contemporary; modern adult contemporary radio	Atlantic; Lava; Melisma	
United States	September 19, 2000	Contemporary hit radio	Atlantic; Lava; Melisma	
United Kingdom	February 5, 2001	CD; cassette	Atlantic; Lava; Melisma	

== See also ==
- List of Billboard Adult Contemporary number ones of 2001
