= Matchbox Twenty =

American rock band

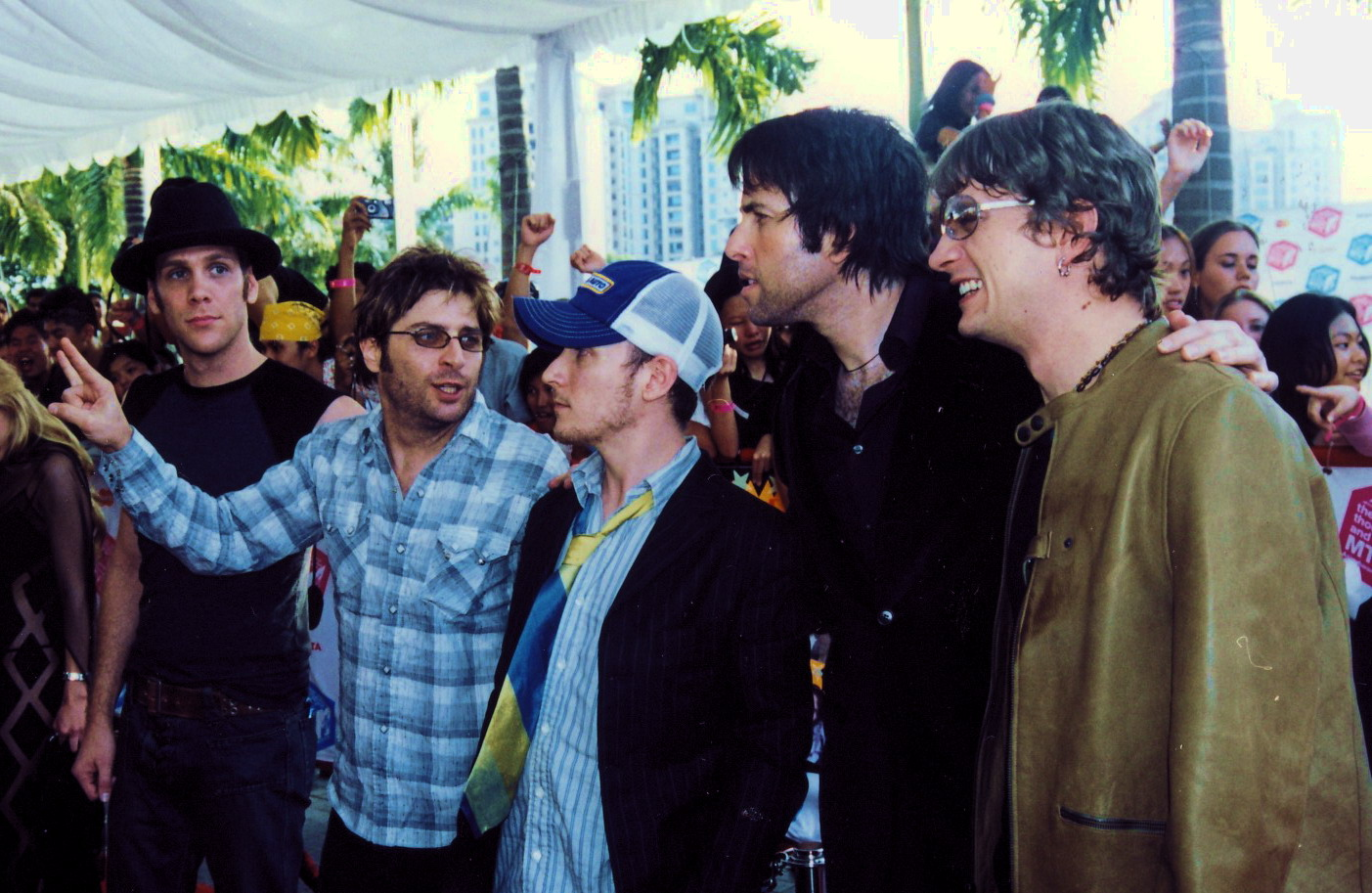
- Matchbox Twenty at the MTV Asia Awards in 2003. Left to right: Kyle Cook, Brian Yale, Paul Doucette, Adam Gaynor, Rob Thomas

Background information
- Origin: Orlando, Florida, United States
- Genres: Alternative rock; pop rock; post-grunge
- Years active: 1995–2004; 2007–present
- Labels: Melisma; Lava; Atlantic
- Spinoffs: The Break and Repair Method
- Spinoff of: Tabitha's Secret
- Members: Rob Thomas; Brian Yale; Paul Doucette; Kyle Cook
- Past members: Adam Gaynor
- Website: matchboxtwenty.com

Matchbox Twenty (formerly stylized as Matchbox 20) is an American rock band formed in 1995 at Orlando, Florida. The group currently consists of Rob Thomas (lead vocals, guitar, keyboards), Brian Yale (bass guitar), Paul Doucette (drums, rhythm guitar, backing vocals), and Kyle Cook (lead guitar, vocals).

Matchbox Twenty rose to international fame with their debut album, Yourself or Someone Like You (1996), which was certified 12× platinum (diamond) in the United States and multi-platinum in Australia, Canada, and New Zealand. Their second album, Mad Season, released in 2000, charted in the top three on the Billboard 200 and was certified 4× platinum in the United States. Their third album, More Than You Think You Are, released in 2002, was certified 2× platinum in the United States.

The band then went on hiatus in 2004 after rhythm guitarist Adam Gaynor's departure. As a result, Paul Doucette took over rhythm guitar when the band reunited in 2007. They released a compilation album, Exile on Mainstream, which was certified gold in the United States. After the release, the band toured to support it. Matchbox Twenty then took another hiatus while Thomas resumed his solo career, but reunited again in 2010. On September 4, 2012, the band released their fourth studio album, North, which debuted at number one on the Billboard 200. Their fifth, Where the Light Goes, was released on May 26, 2023.

== History ==
=== 1995–2001: Yourself or Someone Like You and Mad Season ===
Rob Thomas, Brian Yale, and Paul Doucette were part of the band Tabitha's Secret, which was based in Orlando, Florida, with fellow members Jay Stanley and John Goff, before splitting to start a new band (what was to become Matchbox Twenty). After recruiting Adam Gaynor from Criteria Recording Studios in Miami and Kyle Cook from the Atlanta Institute of Music, the band named themselves "Matchbox 20" and earned a recording contract with Atlantic Records. Doucette suggested the name after combining two words observed on the softball shirt of a man where Doucette was waiting tables. Matchbox 20 released their debut album, Yourself or Someone Like You, in 1996. While their first single, "Long Day", was a radio success in the west coast, the album soon spawned several Top 40 singles throughout 1997 and 1998, including "Push", "3 A.M.", "Real World", and "Back 2 Good". "Push" and "3 A.M." did not chart on the Billboard Hot 100 chart due to the rule in effect prior to 1998 that required a song to be released as a single in order to appear on the Hot 100. "Real World" and "Back 2 Good" proved to be the band's first entries into the Billboard Hot 100, after the rule was terminated. The album eventually shipped more than 12 million copies in the U.S. alone, achieving a diamond certification. In 1998, Matchbox 20 recorded a live version of their single, "3 A.M." for release on the charity album Live in the X Lounge, benefiting United Cerebral Palsy research.

Before recording their second album, Thomas collaborated with Itaal Shur on a song called "Smooth" for Carlos Santana's comeback album, Supernatural. Thomas was supposed to act only as a songwriter for "Smooth", but Carlos Santana had him sing for it after hearing the song's demo. "Smooth" was the album's lead single and became a hit in 1999. Thomas won three Grammy Awards for writing and performing on "Smooth": Record of the Year, Song of the Year, and Best Popular Music Collaboration with Vocals. In 2000, Matchbox 20 adopted the spelling "Matchbox Twenty" and released their second album, Mad Season. The album, on the strength of several successful singles, including "Bent" (which peaked No. 1 on the Hot 100 chart) and "If You're Gone", was certified 4× platinum in the United States. The video for "Bent" made fun of singer Thomas's increased fame from "Smooth" by showing the other band members assaulting him. The next two singles, "Mad Season" and "Last Beautiful Girl" were not as successful.

=== 2002–2004: More Than You Think You Are ===
For their third album, More Than You Think You Are, the band used more of a pop punk/pop rock sound. Thomas shared the songwriting efforts with the other band members on several songs. The album was recorded at Icon Recording Studios in Hollywood, California. Additional recording at Bearsville Studios and Hit Factory in New York and was released on November 19, 2002. The album was produced by Matt Serletic, who at the time was the current chairman for Virgin Records. The album again spawned successful singles "Disease" (written with Mick Jagger), "Unwell", and "Bright Lights". The album was not as successful commercially as the previous two, and received mixed reviews from critics. However, the album had an enormous radio presence for well over a year.

Director Bill Draheim documented the band throughout the process of making More Than You Think You Are. The documentary Theresville was an online extra.

During 2003, the band released EP, consisting of six songs. The EP featured previously unreleased live and acoustic versions of songs like "Push" and "If You're Gone", as well as a new track, "Suffer Me". In 2004, the band released a live DVD, Show: A Night in the Life of Matchbox Twenty, filmed in Atlanta and featuring 20 songs, including all of their previous successful singles.

=== 2004–2010: Hiatuses, side-projects and greatest hits album ===
Before taking a hiatus later that year to allow other members to pursue side projects, such as Paul Doucette's solo band The Break and Repair Method, rhythm guitarist Adam Gaynor officially left the group. Rob Thomas released a solo album, …Something to Be, which debuted at No. 1 on the Billboard 200. The album featured four successful singles: "Lonely No More", "This Is How a Heart Breaks", "Ever the Same", and "Streetcorner Symphony". In January 2007, Rob Thomas released a single, "Little Wonders", which he wrote for the Disney movie Meet the Robinsons.

The group reunited and began performing during 2007, with the release of their retrospective album Exile on Mainstream, on October 2, 2007. "How Far We've Come" was the first single from the new album, which was followed by the second single, "These Hard Times". "Exile on Mainstream" included four other new songs and a complete collection of all eleven of their previously released singles. The album was also released in the new MVI (Music Video Interactive) format, which included two video interviews discussing the six new songs and eleven greatest hits, plus extras including a photo gallery, U-MYX (to remix "How Far We've Come"), buddy icons and wallpapers. "How Far We've Come" was released on the band's Myspace page in July 2007, with the video released on September 6, 2007. Matchbox Twenty toured during early 2008 with Alanis Morissette and opener Mutemath. The band began their US tour on January 25, 2008, in Hollywood, FL, and concluded in Las Vegas, NV, on March 18, 2008, before heading to Australia and New Zealand, where the Australian band Thirsty Merc was the supporting act. Following Australia, Matchbox Twenty visited the UK for the first time in five years to play six concerts in Cardiff, Wembley, Birmingham, Glasgow, and Manchester. Matchbox Twenty performed at the 2008 NASCAR Sprint Cup award ceremony.

When the band finished touring later during 2008, Rob Thomas began work on his second solo album, Cradlesong. He stated in an interview to Billboard that he expected that the other members of the band might begin work on Matchbox Twenty's next album without him. At the concert at Mohegan Sun Casino on December 18, 2009, Thomas said that he was not frequently playing Matchbox Twenty songs at his 2009 tour stops because the band was planning to tour together in 2010.

=== 2010–present: North, focus on tours, and Where the Light Goes ===
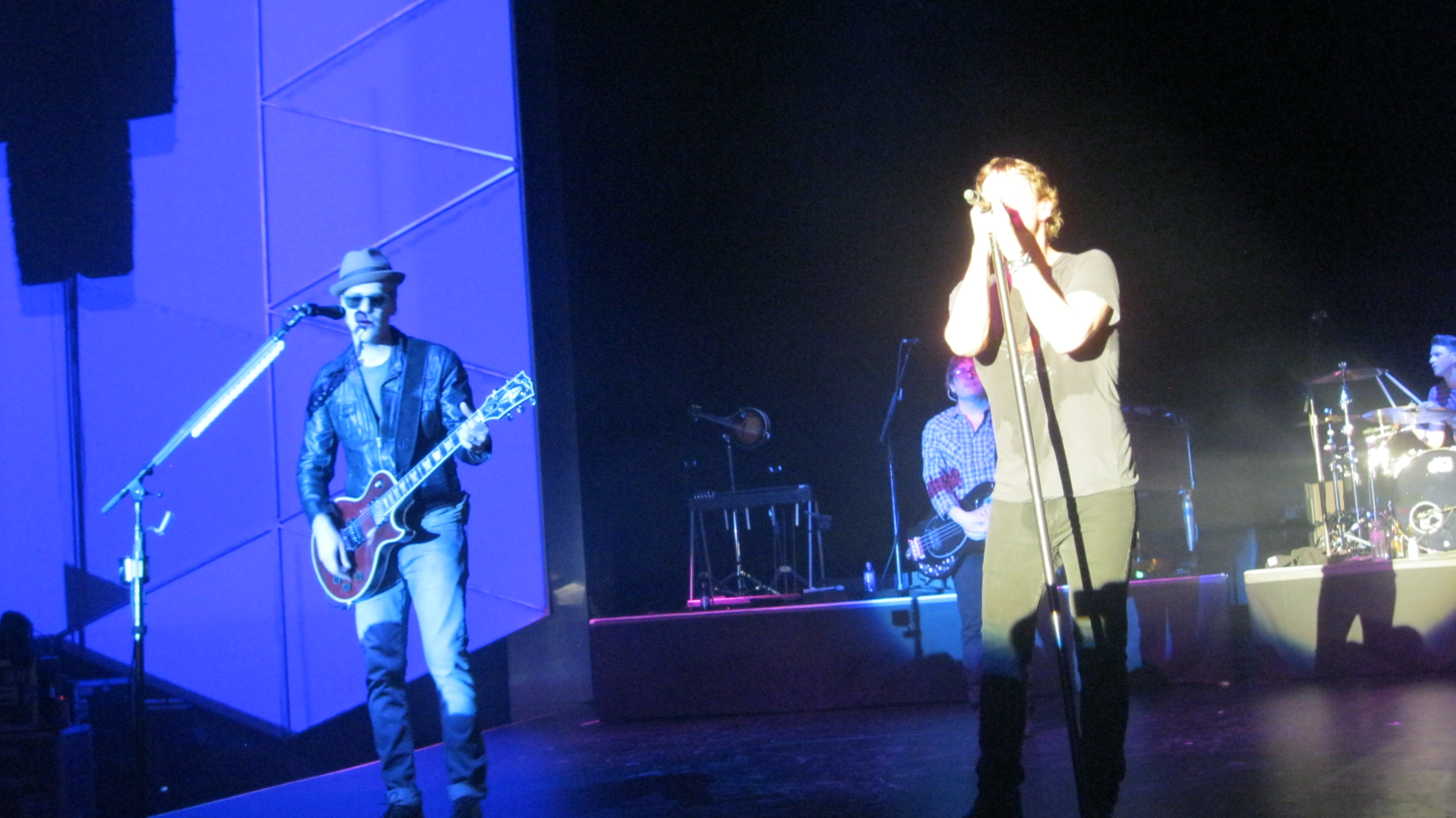
Matchbox Twenty performing in 2013

At the Taste of Chicago on July 2, 2010, Thomas said that Matchbox Twenty would be recording in the fall for their fourth studio album. On September 4, 2010, while on VH1's Top 20 Music Video Countdown, Thomas stated that Matchbox Twenty was planning to start working on their next studio album in mid-September and that he was 80% sure that the album would be released sometime in 2011. Rob Thomas posted on Twitter that he was "heading out next week to start writing the new mb20 record" on September 13, 2010. It was stated on Matchbox Twenty's web site that the next show they will do together is on January 1, 2011, in Oklahoma. Matchbox Twenty played a one-off live show in Temecula, California, on July 9, 2011, but no new material was played. During the show Rob Thomas stated the show was a "love letter to our fans". North was released on September 4, 2012. The album's first single, "She's So Mean", was released on June 12, 2012. In 2012, the band embarked on a worldwide tour, the North Tour, to promote the album. The tour continued as the 2013 Summer Tour, when they co-headlined with the Goo Goo Dolls.

On April 9, 2016, Kyle Cook left the band citing a communication breakdown between the members, but returned in 2017. In 2017 the band toured with the A Brief History of Everything Tour with Counting Crows. Duo Rivers and Rust joined them as an opening act. Doucette described the tour as a celebration of the band's history – stating it "was always going to happen. It just took a bit for everyone to realize that." He said that the band had no plans to release new albums soon at that time and were focused on touring. The band was set to undertake a North American summer tour in 2020 alongside The Wallflowers. Due to the COVID-19 pandemic in the United States, the tour was rescheduled three times, first to 2021, then to 2022, and then to 2023. The band played a one-off performance headlining in St. John's, Newfoundland, Canada for the Churchill Park Music Festival in July 2022.

On June 20, 2022, a video was posted on the band's Twitter account, confirming that a new album is in the works, despite Rob Thomas denying this in interviews the previous year. Having had to make their fans wait for three years to see them on tour again due to cancellations, Kyle Cook suggested that they should make a new album.

On March 1, 2023, the band announced a new single, "Wild Dogs (Running in a Slow Dream)", would be released March 17. On the day of release, the band revealed that their fifth studio album Where the Light Goes would be released on May 26, 2023, via Atlantic.

== Musical style ==
Matchbox Twenty has been categorized pop rock, alternative rock, and post-grunge. Stereogum wrote that their music "melded post-grunge and jangle-rock (a little bit Hootie, a little bit Eddie Vedder), [and] eventually evolved to Maroon 5-type arena pop. According to AllMusic, their music "[blends] the structure and sentiment of '70s arena rock with '90s hard rock."

== Band members ==
Current members

- Rob Thomas – lead vocals (1995–2004, 2007–present), keyboards, piano (1998–2004, 2007–present), acoustic and rhythm guitar (1998–2002, 2012)
- Brian Yale – bass guitar (1995–2004, 2007–present)
- Paul Doucette – drums, percussion (1995–2004 live and in-studio, 2007–present in-studio only), rhythm and acoustic guitar, keyboards (2002–2004 in-studio only, 2007–present), backing vocals (2007–present)
- Kyle Cook – lead guitar, backing and occasional lead vocals, mandolin, banjo (1995–2004, 2007–2016, 2017–present), keyboards (2003, 2012)

Current touring musicians

- Matt Beck – keyboards, rhythm guitar, backing vocals, mandolin, percussion, pedal steel (1999–2004, 2007–present)
- Neal Daniels – drums, percussion (2023–present)

Former members

- Adam Gaynor – rhythm and acoustic guitar, backing vocals (1995–2004)

Former touring musicians

- Joey Huffman – keyboards, rhythm guitar (1998)
- Ryan MacMillan – drums, percussion (2007–2011)
- Stacy Jones – drums, percussion, occasional acoustic guitar (2012–2023)
- Whynot Jansveld – bass guitar (2024; substitute for Brian Yale)
- Jamie Arentzen – acoustic guitar, percussion (2024–2026)

Timeline

== Yourself or Someone Like You lawsuit ==
In May 2005, Matchbox Twenty was sued by New York City resident Frank Torres, the man featured on the album cover of Yourself or Someone Like You. He claimed the band used his image on the album's cover without any consent. Torres also claimed to have been walking down the street when a photographer asked him to pose for a picture. In legal papers, he claims the group "knowingly, intentionally and maliciously" used his picture on the cover, causing him mental anguish. His lawyer claimed the reason for the filing delay of the lawsuit was that Torres only found out about the album cover in 2003, despite the album having been out for seven years and having gone multiple times platinum by that point. The lawsuit was eventually dismissed. Torres passed away in 2016, at the age of 73.

== Discography ==
Studio albums

- Yourself or Someone Like You (1996)
- Mad Season (2000)
- More Than You Think You Are (2002)
- North (2012)
- Where the Light Goes (2023)

== Concert tours ==
Headlining tours

- The Big Rock Show (1997–98)
- Mad Season Tour (2000–01)
- More Than You Think You Are Tour (2003)
- Exile in America Tour (2008)
- North Tour (2012–13)
- 2013 Summer Tour (with the Goo Goo Dolls) (2013)
- A Brief History of Everything Tour (with Counting Crows) (2017)
- Slow Dream Tour (2023–2024)

== Awards & nominations ==
Matchbox Twenty awards and nominations
Awards and nominations
Award	Wins	Nominations
American Music Awards	0	5
Grammy	0	5
MTV VMA	0	2
People's Choice	1	1

Totals (Note: Certain award groups do not simply award one winner. They acknowledge several different recipients, have runners-up, and have third place. Since this is a specific recognition and is different from losing an award, runner-up mentions are considered wins in this award tally. For simplification and to avoid errors, each award in this list has been presumed to have had a prior nomination.)
- Wins: 3
- Nominations: 16

Matchbox Twenty has received nominations at the American Music Awards, the Grammy Awards, and the MTV Video Music Awards, but has only received awards at the People's Choice Awards and APRA Awards. During 2004, the People's Choice Awards gave Matchbox Twenty the award for Favorite Musical Group. In 2009, the APRA Awards gave Matchbox Twenty the award for Most Played Foreign Work. At the American Music Awards, the band was nominated for Favorite Pop/Rock Band/Duo/Group twice, during both 1999 and 2003. Matchbox Twenty received a nomination for Best Rock Album twice at the Grammy Awards, for Mad Season in 2001 and More Than You Think You Are during 2004. Overall, Matchbox Twenty has received two awards from 13 nominations.

=== American Music Awards ===
The American Music Awards is an annual awards ceremony created by Dick Clark in 1973.

Year	Nominee / work	Award	Result
1998	Yourself or Someone Like You	Favorite Pop/Rock Album	Nominated
1998	Matchbox Twenty	Favorite Pop/Rock New Artist	Nominated
1999	Matchbox Twenty	Favorite Pop/Rock Band/Duo/Group	Nominated
2003 (November)	Matchbox Twenty	Favorite Pop/Rock Band/Duo/Group	Nominated
2003 (November)	Matchbox Twenty	Fan's Choice Award	Nominated

=== APRA Awards ===
The APRA Awards are a series of annual award ceremonies created by Australasian Performing Right Association from 1982.

Year	Nominee / work	Award	Result
2001	"Bent" – Kyle Cook, Rob Thomas, Paul Doucette, Brian Yale	Most Played Foreign Work	Won
2009	"All Your Reasons" – Kyle Cook, Rob Thomas, Paul Doucette, Brian Yale	Most Played Foreign Work	Won

=== Grammy Awards ===
The Grammy Awards are awarded annually by the National Academy of Recording Arts and Sciences of the United States.

Year	Nominee / work	Award	Result
1998	"Push"	Best Rock Vocal Performance by a Duo or Group	Nominated
2001	Mad Season	Best Rock Album	Nominated
2001	"Bent"	Best Rock Song	Nominated
2004	"Unwell"	Best Pop Vocal Performance by a Duo or Group	Nominated
2004	More Than You Think You Are	Best Rock Album	Nominated

=== MTV Video Music Awards ===
The MTV Video Music Awards is an annual awards ceremony established during 1984 by MTV.

Year	Nominee / work	Award	Result
1998	"3 AM"	Best Group Video	Nominated
1998	"3 AM"	Viewer's Choice	Nominated

=== People's Choice Awards ===
The People's Choice Awards is an awards show that has been performed annually since 1975.

Year	Nominee / work	Award	Result
2004	Matchbox Twenty	Favorite Musical Group	Won

=== Teen Choice Awards ===
Year	Nominee / work	Award	Result
2001	"If You're Gone"	Choice - Love Song	Nominated
