= Jan Smith =

American singer, songwriter and producer

Mama Jan Smith
- Occupations: Vocal coach, producer, singer, songwriter
- Website: www.jansmith.com

Mama Jan Smith is an American singer, songwriter, vocal coach, and Grammy-nominated music producer from Atlanta, Georgia, who founded Jan Smith Studios.

== Studio career ==
Mama Jan Smith began her musical career as a performer, singer and songwriter, releasing her first album at the age of 15. She has recorded albums both as a solo artist and with music projects, including her 1995 solo release Rain on Rogue Records, and releases from the Jan Smith Band and the Eclectic Cowboys. She also provided background vocals for Atlanta Rhythm Section on their 1997 release Partly Plugged. As the founder of Jan Smith Studios, Inc. in Atlanta, Smith is a vocal coach/producer providing services for a wide range of vocalists, including Rob Thomas, Usher, Ciara, Sugarland, India.Arie, TLC, The Band Perry, Legarda, Drake, Justin Bieber and MattyB. Smith has appeared as a guest on television and in documentaries, including Duets, Behind the Scenes, R U the Girl?, The Real Housewives of Atlanta, and in the documentary Justin Bieber: Never Say Never. She also co-wrote and produced the Justin Bieber song "Where Are You Now?", which appeared as a bonus track on the Australian and Wal-Mart versions of the singer's debut album My World 2.0.

== Publications, organizations and awards ==
Smith has written two books. The first, So You Want To Sing Rock-n-Roll, is a guide for singers who want to become artists. The second, Run The Other Way, is a compilation of her autobiographical writings on her spiritual beliefs. In 2002, she teamed up with producer Huston Singletary to form Smith & Huston Productions, a production facility that worked primarily with unsigned artists to produce demos. In 2010, she founded Plumbline Music Group with business partners Andre Young and Jeffrey Wooten. The company offers a range of music industry services, including production, marketing, management and legal representation. In 2011 Smith, along with businessman Jim Ramseur, founded the Bridge Music Foundation, a non-profit that teaches aspiring musicians the business aspects of a musical career.

Smith was inducted into the Georgia Music Hall of Fame on September 17, 2011, and presented with the Chairmen's Award. Usher and Justin Bieber were present at the ceremony, joining her on stage. She was also recognized by ASCAP, when she was honored in 2011 at ASCAP Rhythm & Soul's 3rd Annual Women Behind the Music Series. She has served as a member of the National Academy of Recording Arts and Sciences, for 25 years, including as a trustee of the Atlanta Chapter, and is a member of the Nashville Songwriters Association International, and the Georgia Music Industry Association. In 2005, she was named as a member of the expert committee for the Chinese Golden Disc Awards, awards that recognize artists, acts and members of the Chinese recording industry. In 2012, Smith was nominated for a Grammy for the Diane Warren song "Born To Be Somebody." Produced by Smith and co-produced by Brandon Hamilton, the song was part of the documentary Justin Bieber: Never Say Never, and earned a nomination for Best Song for Visual Media.
