= Adam Gaynor =

American guitarist (born 1963)

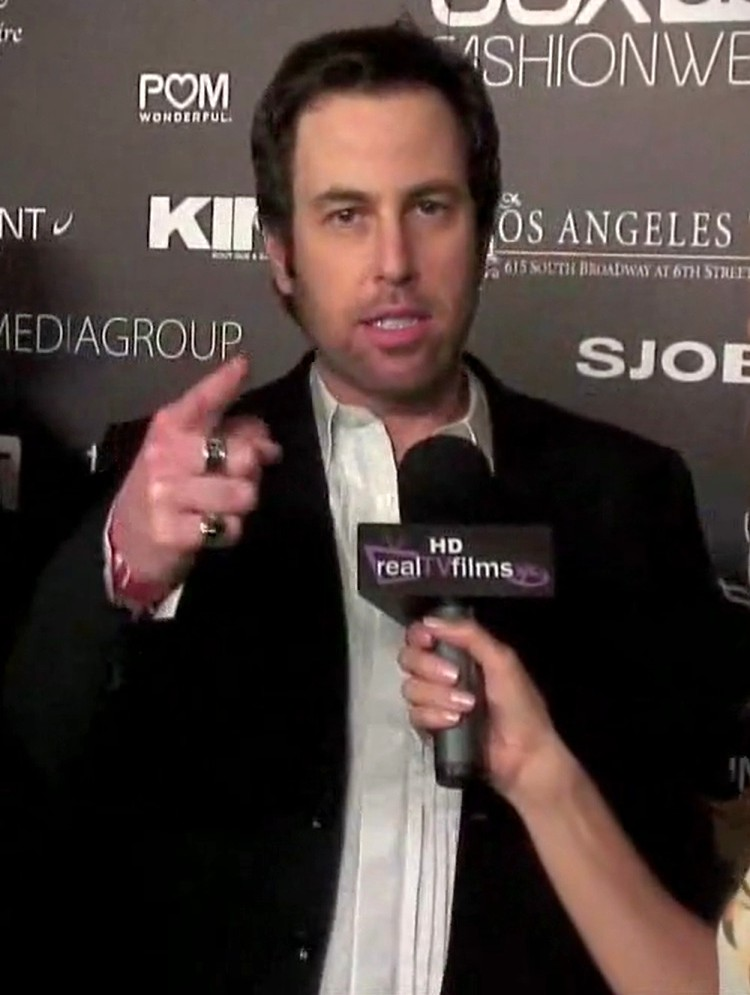
Gaynor in 2009

Adam Gaynor (born November 26, 1963) is an American musician. He is the former rhythm guitarist for the band Matchbox Twenty.

== Career ==
Gaynor was born on November 26, 1963. He served as the rhythm guitarist and background vocalist for Matchbox Twenty from 1995 and performed on their first three albums before he left the band in 2004 while they were on hiatus. After leaving the band, Gaynor co-founded the Matchbox 20 Foundation, which has worked with Make-A-Wish Foundation, Special Olympics, Rock Against Cancer and Best Buddies and Art of Elysium in Los Angeles.

In 2012, Gaynor launched the company Creationville and in September released his first book called This is Edgar Pingleton. On January 22, 2013, he appeared on Park City TV for the 2013 Sundance Film Festival. On March 11, 2013, Adam Gaynor released his first solo tracks, "Stuck" and "Float". On March 26, 2013, he appeared on Bravo TV's Millionaire Matchmaker.

Gaynor is a member of the Canadian charity Artists Against Racism.
