= Matt Serletic =

American record producer

- Born: Matthew Michael Serletic II
- Occupations: Record producer; songwriter; record executive; technologist
- Labels: Emblem Music; Virgin; Atlantic
- Formerly of: Class of '99
- Title: Chairman and CEO, Virgin Records (2002–2005); Director of Product, Google (2019–2024); Director of AI Innovation and Interactive Experiences, Amazon Music (2024–present)
- Children: 3
- Website: emblem-music.com

Matthew Michael Serletic II (born 1971) is an American record producer, songwriter, record executive and technologist. From 2024 through 2026 he was Director of AI Innovation and Interactive Experiences at Amazon Music. In September 2026 he was announced Dean of the Frost School of Music at University of Miami. Previously, he was Director of Product at Google from 2019 to 2024, and founded the record label Emblem Music Group in 2007.

== Education ==
Matt Serletic studied music at the University of Miami, where he played trombone for various salsa and merengue bands around the city, as well as the Palm Beach Opera, Miami Symphony, and other orchestral and Broadway shows. When the bands recorded in studio, he worked as a producer on the recordings. Some of the recordings were played on local radio or wound up on the radio in Latin America, which led to greater exposure for his work, through the time of his masters thesis defense. Around this time he began producing for Tabitha's Secret as well, who he signed to a production and development deal.

== Career ==
As a teenager, Serletic joined a band with members of Collective Soul – a group for which he would later produce. Serletic has worked with several other popular bands and artists for Atlantic Records, including Matchbox Twenty, Cher, Edwin McCain, Stacie Orrico, Taylor Hicks, Rob Thomas, and singer/songwriter Angie Aparo. Serletic worked with American Idol winner David Cook on his second studio album. Author Howard Massey said of Serletic’s production work that he is “a thinking man’s producer, with an approach to record-making that’s truly unique. An accomplished keyboardist, songwriter, and arranger/orchestrator … Serletic is sharply focused, insightful, and—well there is no other way to say it—deep.”

In 1998 he produced the song "I Don't Want to Miss a Thing" by Aerosmith on Hollywood Records, Epic Records, and Columbia Records for the film Armageddon. In 1999 Serletic cofounded Melisma Records with Arista, which he helmed and where he was in charge of A&R direction. Soon after this, he worked with Willie Nelson on his album The Great Divide. In Nelson’s autobiography, he wrote that, “If Matt Serletic can keep me on the charts, I’d be a fool not to give him a chance ... The Great Divide turned out to be a great seller, I like the way it sounded, I like the way I sang inside all those big arrangements and alongside those intriguing duet partners.” He also worked with Joe Cocker, writing and producing his album, Hard Knocks and in 1999 he produced Santana's hit song "Smooth" on the Arista record label with Rob Thomas for what would be his first song as a solo artist (Serletic produced Matchbox Twenty's debut album Yourself or Someone Like You).

Clive Davis mentioned in his autobiography that collaboration had grown out of Serletic’s commenting to Davis that Thomas had been looking to do something outside the band, and to contact him if he had anything. After “I Don’t Want to Miss a Thing” and “Smooth”, Serletic’s third Billboard number one song that he produced was "Bent" by Matchbox 20. Serletic produced each of the albums by Matchbox Twenty. Through these various projects, he has been a producer on several Grammy Award winning records, with five nominations and two wins to his name (Record of the Year "Smooth" in 2000 and Album of the Year for Supernatural that same year).

In 2011, he wrote the song "(Kissed You) Good Night" for the band Gloriana, that was signed to his personal music label Emblem Music. Serletic was quoted by author Mike Senior as saying, “A great record should be like you’re pulling a string towards you constantly, and you never let up: there’s a constant tension that maintains your interest … Especially when I’m doing a final mix, I’m always looking for that point where the string breaks. Then I say, ‘OK, we’ve got to fix that.’ If I don’t believe it past that point, I’ve lost it, it’s not right.”

== Business and television career ==
Serletic was chairman of Virgin Records, a position he held from 2002 to 2005. He was both chairman and chief executive of Virgin Records America from 2004 to 2005. In 2004, at the age of 33, he was named to Crain's New York Business "40 Under 40" list. In 2011, Serletic became a reality show judge on the television show CMT's Next Superstar. In 2015 Serletic founded Zya Music, previously Music Mastermind, Inc., for which he was CEO. Zya initially allowed users to play along to popular songs found in app, and grew into a full-stack cloud music platform. The company also developed the popular music social media app Ditty.it, According to Zya's LinkedIn, which turned personal messages or texts into songs. Zya, Inc. was acquired by Google in 2019, at which point Serletic took on the role of Director of Product at Google until April 2024. At that time he transitioned into the position of Director of AI Innovation and Interactive Experiences at Amazon Music.

== Personal life ==
Serletic is the owner of Emblem Music Group and resides in Calabasas, California, with his wife, Ramona, and their two children. He also helped the rock supergroup Class of '99 in covering Pink Floyd's "Another Brick in the Wall" for the film The Faculty, contributing on the keyboard.
