= Kyle Cook =

American musician (born 1975)

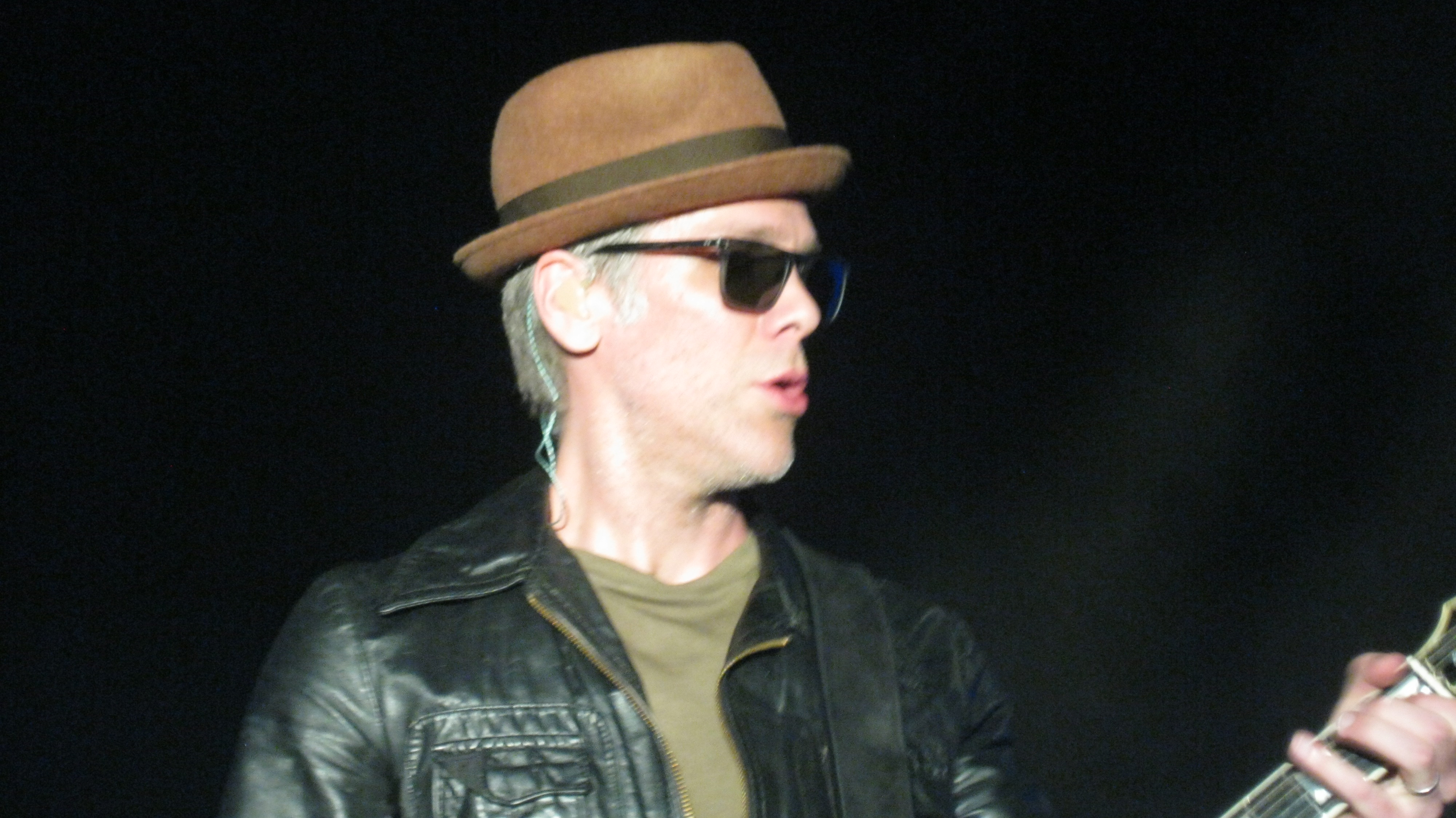
- Cook performing with Matchbox Twenty in 2013

Background information
- Born: David Kyle Cook; August 29, 1975 (age 50); Frankfort, Indiana, U.S.
- Genres: Pop rock; alternative rock; post-grunge; acoustic rock
- Occupation: Musician
- Instruments: Guitar; vocals
- Years active: 1992–present
- Labels: Atlantic
- Member of: Matchbox Twenty
- Formerly of: The New Left
- Website: kylecookmusic.com

David Kyle Cook (born August 29, 1975) is an American musician best known as a member of the band Matchbox Twenty, serving as the lead guitarist, banjo player, backing and occasional lead vocalist.

== Career ==
=== Matchbox Twenty ===
Kyle Cook joined Matchbox Twenty on lead guitar right as the band's other members transitioned from their previous work as Tabitha's Secret, in 1995. He has remained a stable member of the band to this day. Apart from playing guitar, he also sings backing vocals. He plays piano on the song "Hand Me Down" from the album More Than You Think You Are and sings lead vocals on the track "The Way" from North.

In an Instagram post from April 9, 2016, Cook announced his departure from Matchbox Twenty, citing "deterioration of communication, disagreements on when, where and how we tour and a general breakdown of democracy within the group." However, less than a year later on March 27, 2017, Cook announced Matchbox Twenty's North American co-headlining summer tour with Counting Crows, and that his side project Rivers and Rust would be the opening act. Regarding Cook's status in the band, Matchbox Twenty member Paul Doucette replied, "Kyle is back!" in response to a fan's question on Twitter.

=== The New Left ===
After releasing their third album, More Than You Think You Are, in 2002, and spending the next year touring the globe, the members of Matchbox Twenty began to work on separate musical projects. Guitarist Cook reconnected with his former bandmates—drummer Brett Borges and bassist John Kibler. The three had met during high school in rural Indiana. Under the name Downpour, the group had played proms and parties, but had parted ways once graduation came around. After Cook became part of Matchbox Twenty, the trio had kept in touch and recorded demos during Cook's time off from touring. Adopting the name the New Left, they added guitarist and singer-songwriter Eamon Ryland.

The group's only release was the EP Let Go, released in 2004 during Cook's hiatus from Matchbox Twenty. It was recorded at Cook's studio in Orlando, Florida, and it includes six original blues-tinged rock tracks.

=== Solo work and other projects ===
Cook contributed to Mick Jagger's song "Visions of Paradise" on the English rocker's 2001 record Goddess in the Doorway, and he played guitar on Rob Thomas' 2006 single "...Something to Be".

He co-wrote, performed, and produced several songs on John Waite's 2011 album Rough & Tumble, and he co-wrote Love and Theft's 2013 single "If You Ever Get Lonely".

Cook released his debut solo album, Wolves, on October 12, 2018.

== Personal life ==
Cook and his ex-wife, Sabrina, have two daughters, Makenzie (February 23, 1999) and Ava (March 28, 2002).
