= Brian Yale =

American musician (born 1968)

- Born: Brian Joseph Yale; November 14, 1968 (age 57)
- Genres: Pop rock; alternative rock; post-grunge
- Occupation: Musician
- Instrument: Bass guitar
- Years active: 1978–present
- Member of: Matchbox Twenty
- Formerly of: Tabitha's Secret

Brian Joseph Yale (born November 14, 1968) is an American musician who is the bass guitarist for the band Matchbox Twenty. He has been nominated for four Grammy Awards.

== Early life and education ==
Yale grew up in Orange, Connecticut. He graduated from Amity Regional High School (in Woodbridge, CT) in 1987, where he participated in a school band. After high school, he attended Berklee School of Music for one year. He then transferred to University of Miami, graduating a Bachelor of Music in 1993. After college he attended and graduated from the audio engineering program at Full Sail University.

== Career ==
Before joining Matchbox Twenty, he was a member of the band Tabitha's Secret with Rob Thomas and Paul Doucette.
