= Paul Doucette =

American musician

- Born: Paul John Doucette; August 22, 1972 (age 54); North Huntingdon, Pennsylvania, U.S.
- Genres: Pop rock; alternative rock; post-grunge
- Occupation: Musician
- Instruments: Guitar; drums; percussion; piano; vocals
- Years active: 1980s–present
- Member of: Matchbox Twenty
- Formerly of: The Break and Repair Method; Tabitha's Secret

Paul John Doucette (born August 22, 1972) is an American musician best known for being the drummer, rhythm guitarist, and backing vocalist of the band Matchbox Twenty. Doucette is also known as a film composer and as the frontman of his own band The Break and Repair Method. He was married to Moon Zappa from 2002 to 2014.

== Career ==
After moving to Orlando, Doucette met Rob Thomas and Brian Yale and became part of the band Tabitha's Secret. The trio went on to form what would become Matchbox Twenty, which he is credited with naming. For their first three albums, he played mainly the drums. In 2002, for the band's third album, More Than You Think You Are, Doucette took on significantly more instruments to play. He played piano and both acoustic and electric guitar, as well as more obscure instruments such as Synthesizer, Clavinet and Mellotron.

In 2005, with the departure of rhythm guitarist Adam Gaynor, Doucette took over the rhythm guitar duties. The Break and Repair Method drummer Ryan MacMillan took over on the drums for the compilation album Exile on Mainstream with both MacMillan and Doucette playing on the song "How Far We've Come". For the band's fourth album North in 2012, Doucette returned to play the drums, but continued on rhythm guitar and backing vocals.
