= Rob Thomas discography =

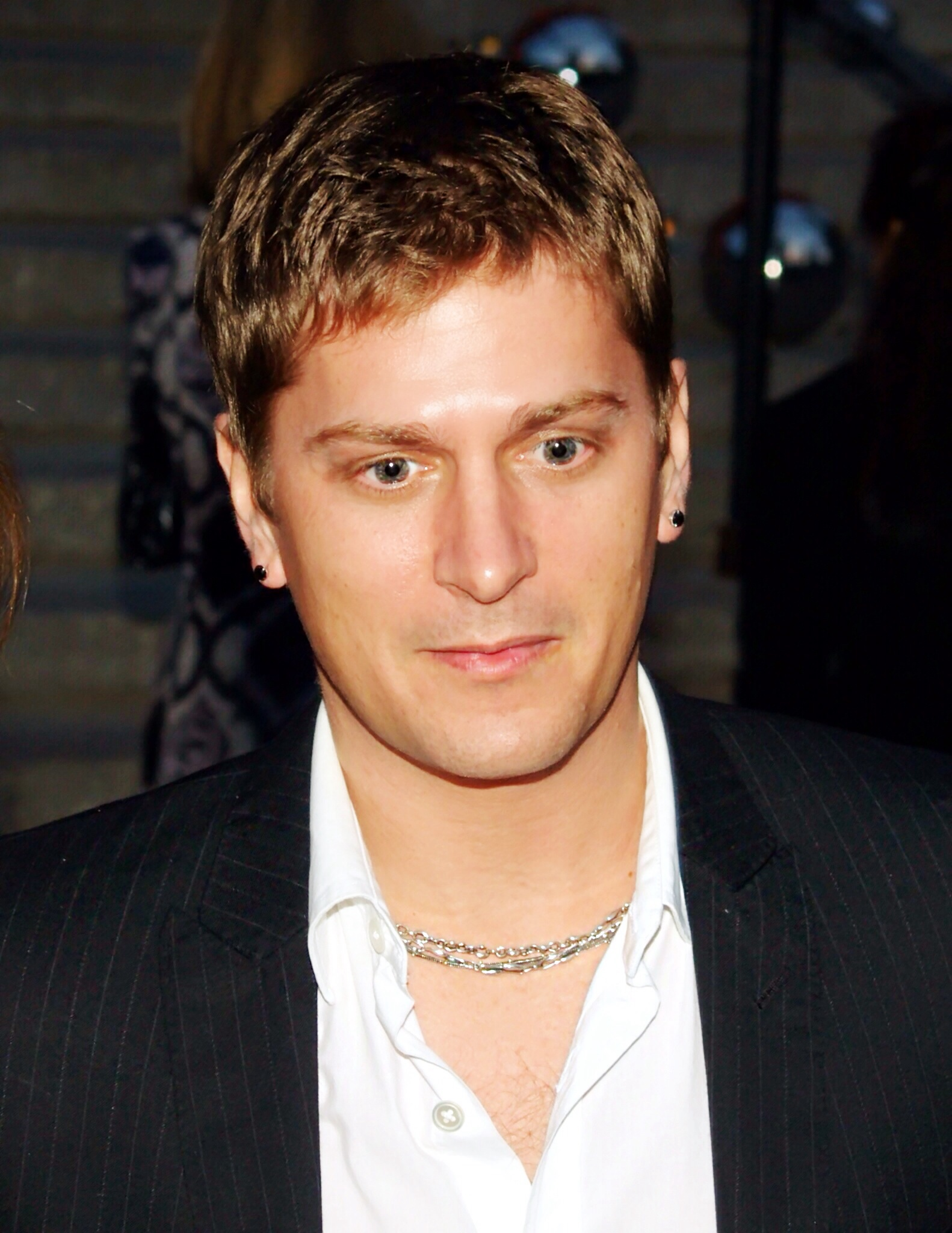
- Thomas at a Vanity Fair party in New York City, 2010
- Studio albums: 6
- Extended plays: 2
- Singles: 22
- Music videos: 9
- Featured singles: 3

Rob Thomas is an American alternative rock singer and songwriter. Along with releasing albums as the lead singer for Matchbox Twenty, Thomas has released six solo studio albums, two extended plays, and eighteen singles.

Thomas' debut album, ...Something to Be, was released on April 5, 2005. It peaked at number one on the US Billboard 200, as well as charting to number on the Australian albums chart. The album featured the Top 10 single "Lonely No More", which peaked at number 6 on the Billboard Hot 100. The song was soon after certified gold by the Recording Industry Association of America. ...Something to Be was subsequently certified platinum by the Recording Industry Association of America.

Cradlesong, Thomas' second album, was released in June 2009. It peaked at number 3 on the Billboard 200. Four singles were released, including the single "Her Diamonds", Thomas' second Top 40 single on the Hot 100. The three additional singles released all failed to crack the Top 40 in the US, but the album was eventually certified Gold by the Recording Industry Association of America.

Other than recording solo albums and albums with Matchbox Twenty, Thomas was also featured on "Smooth", a 1999 single by Santana. The song was an international success, peaking within the Top 20 of several countries around the world, and becoming a number one single on the Billboard Hot 100. In 2010, Thomas was once again featured on a Santana song. "Sunshine of Your Love" was released as a single from Santana's album, Guitar Heaven: The Greatest Guitar Classics of All Time.

== Albums ==
=== Studio albums ===
List of albums, with selected chart positions and certifications
Title	Album details	Peak chart positions										Certifications
Title	Album details	US	AUS	AUT	CAN	GER	NOR	NZ	SWE	SWI	UK	Certifications
...Something to Be	Released: April 19, 2005; Label: Atlantic; Format: CD, digital download, streaming	1	1	19	2	10	13	14	19	19	11	RIAA: 2× Platinum; ARIA: 3× Platinum; MC: Platinum
Cradlesong	Released: June 30, 2009; Label: Atlantic; Format: CD, digital download, streaming	3	3	—	8	40	—	17	—	56	75	RIAA: Gold; ARIA: 2× Platinum
The Great Unknown	Released: August 21, 2015; Label: Atlantic; Format: CD, digital download, streaming	6	4	—	13	—	—	31	—	—	95	
Chip Tooth Smile	Released: April 26, 2019; Label: Atlantic; Format: CD, digital download, streaming	13	3	—	36	—	—	—	—	—	—	
Something About Christmas Time	Released: October 22, 2021; Label: Atlantic; Format: CD, digital download, streaming	—	—	—	—	—	—	—	—	—	—	
All Night Days	Released: September 5, 2025; Label: Universal; Format: CD, LP, digital download, streaming	133	37	—	—	—	—	—	—	—	—	
"—" denotes a recording that did not chart or was not released in that territory.

=== Video albums ===
List of video albums, with selected details and certifications
Title	Details	Certification
Something to Be Tour Live at Red Rocks	Released: 2008; Label: E1 Entertainment; Format: Blu Ray / DVD	ARIA: Gold

=== Extended plays ===
List of extended plays, with selected chart positions
Title	EP details	Peak chart positions
Title	EP details	US
...Something More	Released: 2005; Label: Atlantic; Format: CD, digital download	—
Someday	Released: March 22, 2010; Label: Atlantic; Format: CD, digital download	91
"—" denotes a recording that did not chart.

== Singles ==
=== As lead artist ===
List of singles, with select chart positions, showing album, year released and certifications
Single	Year	Peak chart positions											Certifications (sales threshold)	Album
Single	Year	US	US AC	AUS	AUT	CAN	GER	NL	NZ	SWE	SWI	UK	Certifications (sales threshold)	Album
"A New York Christmas"	2003	—	—	—	—	—	—	—	—	—	—	—		Non-album single
"Lonely No More"	2005	6	1	3	24	—	16	39	9	10	24	11	RIAA: Platinum; ARIA: Platinum	...Something to Be
"This Is How a Heart Breaks"	2005	52	25	13	—	—	—	—	24	—	—	67	RIAA: Gold	...Something to Be
"Ever the Same"	2005	48	4	29	—	—	—	—	34	—	—	—	RIAA: Gold	...Something to Be
"...Something to Be"	2006	—	—	40	—	—	—	—	—	—	—	—		...Something to Be
"Streetcorner Symphony"	2006	64	4	—	—	—	—	—	—	—	—	—	RIAA: Gold	...Something to Be
"Little Wonders"	2007	58	11	20	13	22	20	—	—	—	40	—	RIAA: Platinum; RMNZ: Platinum	Meet the Robinsons: An Original Walt Disney Records Soundtrack
"Her Diamonds"	2009	23	2	3	—	27	79	—	35	—	—	—	RIAA: Platinum; ARIA: Platinum	Cradlesong
"Give Me the Meltdown"	2009	—	—	41	—	89	—	—	—	—	—	—		Cradlesong
"Someday"	2009	59	4	—	—	—	—	—	—	—	—	—	RIAA: Gold	Cradlesong
"Mockingbird"	2010	95	27	50	—	73	—	—	—	—	—	—		Cradlesong
"Real World '09"	2010	—	—	—	—	—	—	—	—	—	—	—		Cradlesong
"Trust You"	2015	—	26	—	—	—	—	—	—	—	—	—		The Great Unknown
"Hold On Forever"	2015	—	25	55	—	—	—	—	—	—	—	—		The Great Unknown
"Pieces"	2016	—	12	—	—	—	—	—	—	—	—	—		The Great Unknown
"Heaven Help Me"	2016	—	—	—	—	—	—	—	—	—	—	—		The Great Unknown
"One Less Day (Dying Young)"	2019	—	18	— (Note: "One Less Day (Dying Young)" did not enter the Top 100, but peaked at number 42 on the Digital Singles Chart.)	—	—	—	—	—	—	—	—		Chip Tooth Smile
"Can't Help Me Now"	2019	—	—	—	—	—	—	—	—	—	—	—		Chip Tooth Smile
"I Believe in Santa Claus" (with Abby Anderson)	2020	—	—	—	—	—	—	—	—	—	—	—		Something About Christmas Time
"Christmas Time" (featuring Ingrid Michaelson)	2021	—	—	—	—	—	—	—	—	—	—	—		Something About Christmas Time
"Santa Don't Come Here Anymore" (featuring Brad Paisley)	2021	—	—	—	—	—	—	—	—	—	—	—		Something About Christmas Time
"That Spirit of Christmas" (featuring BeBe Winans)	2021	—	—	—	—	—	—	—	—	—	—	—		Something About Christmas Time
"Hard to Be Happy"	2025	—	26	—	—	—	—	—	—	—	—	—		All Night Days
"Thrill Me"	2025	—	—	—	—	—	—	—	—	—	—	—		All Night Days
"Picture Perfect"	2025	—	—	—	—	—	—	—	—	—	—	—		All Night Days
"Machine"	2025	—	—	—	—	—	—	—	—	—	—	—		All Night Days
"—" denotes releases that did not chart

=== As featured artist ===
Single	Year	Peak chart positions										Certifications (sales threshold)	Album
Single	Year	US	US AC	AUS	AUT	CAN	GER	NZ	NL	SWI	UK	Certifications (sales threshold)	Album
"Smooth" (Santana featuring Rob Thomas)	1999	1	11	4	9	13	21	18	40	18	3	AUS: 2× Platinum; RMNZ: 2× Platinum; US: Platinum	Supernatural
"Sunshine of Your Love" (Santana featuring Rob Thomas)	2011	—	—	—	—	—	11	—	—	—	—		Guitar Heaven
"Move" (Santana featuring Rob Thomas and American Authors)	2021	—	11	—	—	—	—	—	—	—	—		Blessings and Miracles
"—" denotes releases that did not chart

== Music videos ==
List of music videos, showing year released and directors
Title	Year	Director(s)
"Lonely No More"	2005	Joseph Kahn
"This Is How a Heart Breaks"	2005	Pedro Romhanyi
"Ever the Same"	2005	Phil Harder
"Little Wonders"	2007	Dave Meyers
"Her Diamonds"	2009	Dave Meyers
"Give Me the Meltdown"	2009	Walter Robot
"Someday"	2009	Alan Ferguson
"Trust You"	2015	Phil Harder
"Hold on Forever"	2015	Alex Herron
"Pieces"	2016	Garen Barsegian
"One Less Day (Dying Young)"	2019	Andy Morahan
"Can't Help Me Now"	2019	Kevin Slack
"Small Town Christmas"	2021	
"Hard to Be Happy"	2025	Neta Ben Ezra
"Machine"	2025	Justin Moon

== Other appearances ==
Song	Year	Artist	Album
"This Is How a Heart Breaks"	2013	Straight No Chaser	Under the Influence
