= The Great Unknown Tour =

2015–16 concert tour by Rob Thomas

- Tour by Rob Thomas
- Promotional poster for the tour
- Associated album: The Great Unknown
- Start date: June 11, 2015
- End date: March 6, 2016
- Legs: 4
- No. of shows: 67 in North America; 8 in Australia; 75 total

Rob Thomas concert chronology
- Cradlesong Tour (2009–10); The Great Unknown Tour (2015); ...

The Great Unknown Tour was the fourth concert tour by American recording artist, Rob Thomas. Beginning June 2015, the tour supported his third studio album, The Great Unknown. The tour predominantly visited North America, with performances in theaters and amphitheaters and at music festivals during the summer.

== Background ==
After wrapping up the 2013 tour with band Matchbox Twenty, Thomas began recording his third solo album. In spring 2014, the singer launched his third solo tour, showcasing two new songs, "I Think We Feel Good Together" and "Heaven Help Me". Later that year, Thomas announced the album title via Twitter. In March 2015, Thomas posted a video to YouTube, announcing the tour. In the video, Thomas stated he will release the single and album before the tour kick off in the summer. The singer also stated he would perform new songs from the album, alongside his solo hits and hits from his band.

=== Cancellations ===
For the first time in his solo career, Thomas had to cancel many concerts during the tour. The first was the concert in Denver, Colorado. Opening act The Plain White T's added an additional 20 minutes to their set, before the announcement was made. It was explained that Thomas suffered an allergy attack and lost his voice. He later took to Twitter to post the disappointment, along with photos of him at the doctor. Later in July, Thomas's wife Marisol required brain surgery, causing 11 shows to be cancelled. Luckily, many of the dates were able to be rescheduled, with the exception of Cincinnati and North Charleston. Lack of venue availability was given of the reasons for the dates permanent cancellation.

== Opening acts ==
- Plain White T's (North America—select dates)
- Vinyl Station (North America—select dates)
- Pete Murray (Australia)
- American Authors (Seattle)
- Darren Middleton (Pokolbin, Mount Cotton and Yarra Valley)
- Shaun Black (Yarra Valley)

== Setlist ==
The following setlist is obtained from the June 11, 2015 in Rama, Ontario, held at the Casino Rama Entertainment Centre. It does not represent all concerts during the run of the tour.

1. "Give Me the Meltdown"
2. "Fallin' to Pieces"
3. "Lonely No More"
4. "Real World '09"
5. "Mockingbird"
6. "Trust You"
7. "Cradlesong"
8. "One Shot"
9. "Her Diamonds"
10. "Ever the Same"
11. "Someday"
12. "Fire on the Mountain"
13. "Hold On Forever"
14. "Streetcorner Symphony"
15. "3AM"
16. "Little Wonders"
17. "I Am an Illusion"

Encore

18. "...Something to Be"
19. "Smooth"
20. "This Is How a Heart Breaks"

== Tour dates ==
Date	City	Country	Venue
North America
June 11, 2015	Rama	Canada	Casino Rama Entertainment Centre
June 12, 2015	Windsor	Canada	The Colosseum at Caesars Windsor
June 13, 2015	Akron	United States	Akron Civic Theatre
June 15, 2015	Columbus	United States	Palace Theatre
June 16, 2015	Indianapolis	United States	Murat Theatre
June 18, 2015	Milwaukee	United States	Riverside Theater
June 19, 2015	Minneapolis	United States	Northrop Auditorium
June 20, 2015	Council Bluffs	United States	Stir Concert Cove
June 22, 2015^{[A]}	Kansas City	United States	Sprint Center
June 25, 2015^{[B]}	Salt Lake City	United States	Red Butte Garden Amphitheatre
June 27, 2015^{[C]}	Boise	United States	Expo Idaho
June 29, 2015	Seattle	United States	Paramount Theatre
June 30, 2015	Portland	United States	Arlene Schnitzer Concert Hall
July 2, 2015	Saratoga	United States	Mountain Winery Amphitheater
July 3, 2015	Modesto	United States	Mary Stuart Rogers Theater
July 5, 2015	Paso Robles	United States	Vina Robles Amphitheatre
July 7, 2015	Riverside	United States	Fox Performing Arts Center
July 9, 2015	Phoenix	United States	Comerica Theatre
July 11, 2015	San Antonio	United States	Majestic Theatre
July 12, 2015	Austin	United States	Moody Theater
July 18, 2015^{[D]}	Highland Park	United States	Ravinia Pavilion
July 31, 2015	Red Bank	United States	Count Basie Theatre
August 1, 2015	Red Bank	United States	Count Basie Theatre
August 2, 2015	Atlantic City	United States	Borgata Event Center
August 4, 2015	Bethlehem	United States	Sands Bethlehem Event Center
August 5, 2015	Boston	United States	Leader Bank Pavilion
August 6, 2015	New York City	United States	Beacon Theatre
August 8, 2015	New York City	United States	Beacon Theatre
August 9, 2015	Uncasville	United States	Mohegan Sun Arena
August 10, 2015	Morristown	United States	Mayo Performing Arts Center
August 13, 2015	Englewood	United States	Bergen Performing Arts Center
August 20, 2015	St. Augustine	United States	St. Augustine Amphitheatre
August 21, 2015	Clearwater	United States	Ruth Eckerd Hall
August 26, 2015	Portsmouth	United States	nTelos Wireless Pavilion
August 28, 2015	Nashville	United States	Ryman Auditorium
August 29, 2015^{[E]}	Memphis	United States	Memphis Botanic Garden
August 30, 2015^{[F]}	Atlanta	United States	Delta Classic Chastain Park Amphitheater
September 1, 2015	Charlotte	United States	Uptown Amphitheatre
September 3, 2015	Tulsa	United States	Brady Theater
September 4, 2015	St. Louis	United States	Peabody Opera House
October 20, 2015	New Orleans	United States	Saenger Theatre
October 21, 2015	Mobile	United States	Saenger Theatre
October 23, 2015	Hollywood	United States	Hard Rock Live
October 25, 2015	Columbia	United States	Township Auditorium
October 27, 2015	Louisville	United States	The Louisville Palace
October 28, 2015	Cincinnati	United States	Taft Theatre
October 29, 2015	Joliet	United States	Rialto Square Theatre
October 31, 2015	Des Moines	United States	Civic Center of Greater Des Moines
November 1, 2015	Sioux City	United States	Orpheum Theatre
November 2, 2015	Cedar Rapids	United States	Paramount Theatre
November 4, 2015	Wichita	United States	Orpheum Theatre
November 7, 2015^{[G]}	St. Helena	United States	Sutter Home Winery
November 9, 2015	Denver	United States	Paramount Theatre
November 10, 2015	Colorado Springs	United States	Pikes Peak Center for the Performing Arts
December 3, 2015^{[H]}	Sacramento	United States	Sacramento Memorial Auditorium
December 5, 2015^{[I]}	Las Vegas	United States	The Joint
December 7, 2015^{[J]}	Pittsburgh	United States	Petersen Events Center
December 8, 2015	Huntington	United States	Paramount Theater
December 10, 2015^{[K]}	Silver Spring	United States	The Fillmore Silver Springs
December 12, 2015^{[L]}	Wallingford	United States	Toyota Oakdale Theatre
December 14, 2015^{[M]}	Clearwater	United States	Ruth Eckerd Hall
December 16, 2015^{[N]}	Houston	United States	Revention Music Center
December 31, 2015^{[O]}	Austin	United States	Brazos Hall
January 2, 2016	Thackerville	United States	WinStar Global Center
January 15, 2016	Atlantic City	United States	Borgata Music Box
January 16, 2016	Atlantic City	United States	Borgata Music Box
January 17, 2016	Atlantic City	United States	Borgata Music Box
Australia
February 20, 2016	Melbourne	Australia	Rod Laver Arena
February 22, 2016	Canberra	Australia	Royal Theatre
February 24, 2016^{[P]}	Sydney	Australia	Sydney Opera House Forecourt
February 27, 2016	Pokolbin	Australia	Hope Estate Winery Amphitheatre
February 28, 2016^{[Q]}	Mount Cotton	Australia	Sirromet Winery
March 2, 2016	Perth	Australia	Pioneer Women's Memorial Fountain
March 5, 2016^{[R]}	Adelaide	Australia	Adelaide Street Circuit Concert Oval
March 6, 2016^{[Q]}	Yarra Valley	Australia	Rochford Wines Estate

Festivals and other miscellaneous performances

^{A} The concert was a part of the "UMB Big Bash"
^{B} The concert was a part of the "Red Butte Garden Outdoor Concert Series"
^{C} The concert was a part of the "Boise Music Festival"
^{D} The concert was a part of the "Ravinia Festival"
^{E} The concert was a part of the "Live at the Garden Summer Concert Series"
^{F} The concert was a part of the "Live Nation Concert Series"
^{G} This concert is a part of "Live in the Vineyard"
^{H} This concert was a part of "Santa Slam"
^{I} This concert was a part of the "Not So Silent Night"
^{J} This concert was a part of "Oh Starry Night"
^{K} This concert was a part of the "Not So Silent Night"
^{L} This concert was a part of "All Star Christmas"
^{M} This concert was a part of the "Mistletoe Show"
^{N} This concert is a part of the "Not So Silent Night"
^{O} This concert is a part of "Rock the Brazos"
^{P} This concert is a part of "On the Steps"
^{Q} This concert is a part of "A Day on the Green"
^{R} This concert is a part of the "After Race Concert Series"

Cancellations and rescheduled shows

June 24, 2015	Denver, Colorado	Paramount Theatre	Rescheduled for November 9, 2015
July 13, 2015	Tulsa, Oklahoma	Brady Theater	Rescheduled for September 3, 2015
July 15, 2015	St. Louis, Missouri	Peabody Opera House	Rescheduled for September 4, 2015
July 17, 2015	Memphis, Tennessee	Memphis Botanic Garden	Rescheduled for August 29, 2015
July 19, 2015	Cincinnati, Ohio	The Shoe at Horseshoe Casino Cincinnati	Cancelled
July 21, 2015	Atlanta, Georgia	Delta Classic Chastain Park Amphitheater	Rescheduled for August 30, 2015
July 22, 2015	Nashville, Tennessee	Ryman Auditorium	Rescheduled for August 28, 2015
July 24, 2015	Clearwater, Florida	Ruth Eckerd Hall	Rescheduled for August 21, 2015
July 25, 2015	St. Augustine, Florida	St. Augustine Amphitheatre	Rescheduled for August 20, 2015
July 26, 2015	North Charleston, South Carolina	North Charleston Performing Arts Center	Cancelled
July 28, 2015	Charlotte, North Carolina	Uptown Amphitheatre	Rescheduled for September 1, 2015
July 29, 2015	Portsmouth, Virginia	nTelos Wireless Pavilion	Rescheduled for August 26, 2015

=== Box office score data ===
Venue	City	Tickets sold / available	Gross revenue
The Colosseum at Caesars Windsor	Windsor	3,730 / 4,934 (76%)	$189,872
Northrop Auditorium	Minneapolis	2,012 / 2,562 (78%)	$134,184
Stir Concert Cove	Council Bluffs	3,120 / 4,000 (78%)	$132,697
Vina Robles Amphitheatre	Paso Robles	2,042 / 3,018 (68%)	$108,886
Beacon Theatre	New York City	4,934 / 5,440 (91%)	$433,705
Mohegan Sun Arena	Uncasville	5,547 / 6,859 (81%)	$269,030
St. Augustine Amphitheatre	St. Augustine	2,108 / 3,000 (70%)	$127,015
Saenger Theatre	Mobile	867 / 1,797 (48%)	$52,423
Township Auditorium	Columbia	1,006 / 2,852 (35%)	$60,915
Paramount Theater	Huntington	1,573 / 1,573 (100%)	$87,153
TOTAL		26,939 / 36,035 (75%)	$1,595,880
