= Cradlesong Tour =

2009–10 concert tour by Rob Thomas

- Tour by Rob Thomas
- Promotional poster for the tour
- Associated album: Cradlesong; Someday EP
- Start date: September 18, 2009
- End date: August 28, 2010
- Legs: 3
- No. of shows: 59 in North America; 11 in Australia; 70 total

Rob Thomas concert chronology
- Something to Be Tour (2005–06); Cradlesong Tour (2009–10); The Great Unknown Tour (2015)

The Cradlesong Tour (stylized cradlesong tour) was the second solo concert tour by Matchbox Twenty frontman Rob Thomas. The tour supported his second studio album, Cradlesong and the digital EP, Someday EP. The tour primarily visited North America and Australia. During the summer of 2010, the tour morphed into the Sidewalk Angels Tour, benefiting the charity of the same name.

== Background ==
The reason I do what I do is because I have all these songs that are always building up in my head, so it's really cathartic to get a load of them out into the world and start over again [and] the solo career is a really important way for me to do that.

After the success of his debut album ...Something to Be, Thomas rejoined his band for the release of their first greatest hits album and tour. In 2008, Thomas went back into the studio and began recording his next album. The tour began in the fall of 2009 in Arizona and continued into 2010 with a few dates in Australia. After a three-month hiatus, Thomas continued to tour into the summer of 2010. The tour, given the name "Sidewalk Angels Tour" benefited the Sidewalk Angels Foundation, created by Thomas’ wife, Marisol. Thomas described the summer outing as an intimate performance allowing the songs to speak for themselves. He further states, "It's a chance for me, as a songwriter, to really highlight lyric and melody and to create different versions of songs that I’ve been playing for years. We’ll be doing my solo stuff, Matchbox Twenty songs and covers. It will be a real ‘Storytellers’ kind of vibe."

== Opening acts ==
- OneRepublic (North America—Leg 1)
- Carolina Liar (North America—Leg 1)
- Vanessa Amorosi (Australia)

== Setlist ==
North America

Leg 1

1. "Fire on the Mountain"
2. "Give Me the Meltdown"
3. "Real World '09"
4. "Lonely No More"
5. "Mockingbird"
6. "Sunday Morning, New York Blue"
7. "Streetcorner Symphony"
8. "Natural"
9. Medley: "Getting Late" / "That's All Right"
10. "Hard on You"
11. "Ever the Same"
12. "Cradlesong"
13. "Someday"
14. "Something to Be"
15. "Gasoline"
16. "Little Wonders"
17. "Fallin' to Pieces" (contains excerpts from "I'm Yours")
18. "Her Diamonds"
19. "I Am an Illusion"

Encore

20. "Bent"
21. "Feel So Bad"
22. "Smooth"
23. "This Is How a Heart Breaks"

Leg 2—Sidewalk Angels Tour

1. "Mockingbird"
2. "Sleep 'Til War is Over"
3. "When the Heartache Ends"
4. "Ever the Same"
5. "Bent"
6. "Save the Last Dance for Me"
7. "3 A.M."
8. Medley: "Getting Late" / "That's All Right"
9. "Streetcorner Symphony"
10. "Now Comes the Night"
11. "Lonely No More"
12. "Her Diamonds"
13. "Someday"
14. "Disease"
15. "Unwell"
16. "You Won't Be Mine"

Encore

17. "Jane Says"
18. "Smooth"
19. "This Is How a Heart Breaks" (contains excerpts from "867-5309/Jenny")
20. "Bright Lights"
Australia
1. "Fire on the Mountain"
2. "Give Me the Meltdown"
3. "Real World '09"
4. "Lonely No More"
5. "Mockingbird"
6. "Sunday Morning, New York Blue"
7. "Streetcorner Symphony"
8. "Natural"
9. Medley: "Getting Late" / "That's All Right"
10. "Feel So Bad"
11. "Ever the Same"
12. "Cradlesong"
13. "Someday"
14. "Something to Be"
15. "Little Wonders"
16. "Fallin' to Pieces" (contains excerpts from "I'm Yours")
17. "Her Diamonds"
18. "I Am an Illusion"

Encore

19. "Remembered Well"
20. "Smooth"
21. "This Is How a Heart Breaks"

=== Additional notes ===
- "Not Just a Woman" was performed at Hard Rock Live in Hollywood, Florida. It was also performed at the Coeur d'Alene Casino Resort Event Center in Worley, Idaho and the Event Center Arena in San Jose, California in lieu of "Hard on You".
- "3 A.M." was performed at the Hard Rock Live in Orlando, Florida in lieu of "Bent".
- "Time After Time" was performed at the Ruth Eckerd Hall in Clearwater, Florida. It was also performed at the Coeur d'Alene Casino Resort Event Center in Worley, Idaho in lieu of "Jane Says"
- A cover of U2's "Desire" was included in the performance at the Hard Rock Live in Orlando, Florida.
- "Still Ain't Over You" was performed at the Ruth Eckerd Hall in Clearwater, Florida and the Koka Booth Amphitheatre in Cary, North Carolina in lieu of "Feel So Bad".
- "When the Heartache Ends" was included in the performance at the Koka Booth Amphitheatre in Cary, North Carolina in lieu of "Hard on You".
- At the Reno Events Center in Reno, Nevada, Thomas performed, "Wonderful" in lieu of "Hard on You. Also, "Mammas Don't Let Your Babies Grow Up to Be Cowboys" in lieu of "Bent".
- During the performance at the Event Center Arena in San Jose, California, "Ain't No Sunshine" and "Voodoo Child (Slight Return)" replaced "Bent" and "Feel So Bad" respectively.
- At the Pearl Concert Theater in Las Vegas, Nevada, Thomas performed "Dancing in the Dark" in lieu of "Hard on You". Additionally, he performed "The Gambler" in lieu of "Gasoline". Also, "Baby Can I Hold You" and "One" replaced "Bent" and "Feel So Bad" respectively.
- At the Midland Theatre in Kansas City, Missouri, Thomas performed "Dear Joan" along with a cover of Modern English's I Melt With You in lieu of "Bent" and "Feel So Bad" respectively.
- At the Beacon Theatre in New York City, New York, Thomas performed, "Voodoo Child (Slight Return)" and "Bright Lights" in lieu of "Bent" and "Feel So Bad" respectively.
- For concerts performed during December 2009, Thomas performed "New York Christmas" in lieu of "Bent" and "Feel So Bad".
- At the concert at Sandalford Wines Estate in Caversham, Western Australia, Australia, Thomas performed "Let's Dance".
- "The Nearness of You and Just Like Heaven" were performed at the Casino Rama Entertainment Centre in Orilla, Ontario, Canada
- A cover of "I Melt with You" and "Dizzy" (a song from Thomas' former band Tabitha's Secret) were performed the Seneca Niagara Events Center in Niagara Falls, New York in lieu of the medley. Additionally, "Bright Lights" was performed at this concert.
- A cover of Matchbox Twenty's "The Difference" was performed in lieu of "When the Heartache Ends" at the Fantasy Springs Special Events Center in Indio, California.
- Elton John's "Mona Lisas and Mad Hatters" was included in the performance at the Sandbar at Red Rock in Las Vegas, Nevada in lieu of "Save the Last Dance for Me".
- Willie Nelson's "Crazy" was performed at the Coeur d'Alene Casino Resort Event Center in Worley in lieu of "Save the Last Dance for Me".
- For the final performance at the Mohegan Sun Arena in Uncasville, Connecticut, Thomas performed "Dear Joan" in lieu of "Save the Last Dance for Me". Also, INXS' Never Tear Us Apart replaced "Jane Says".

== Tour dates ==
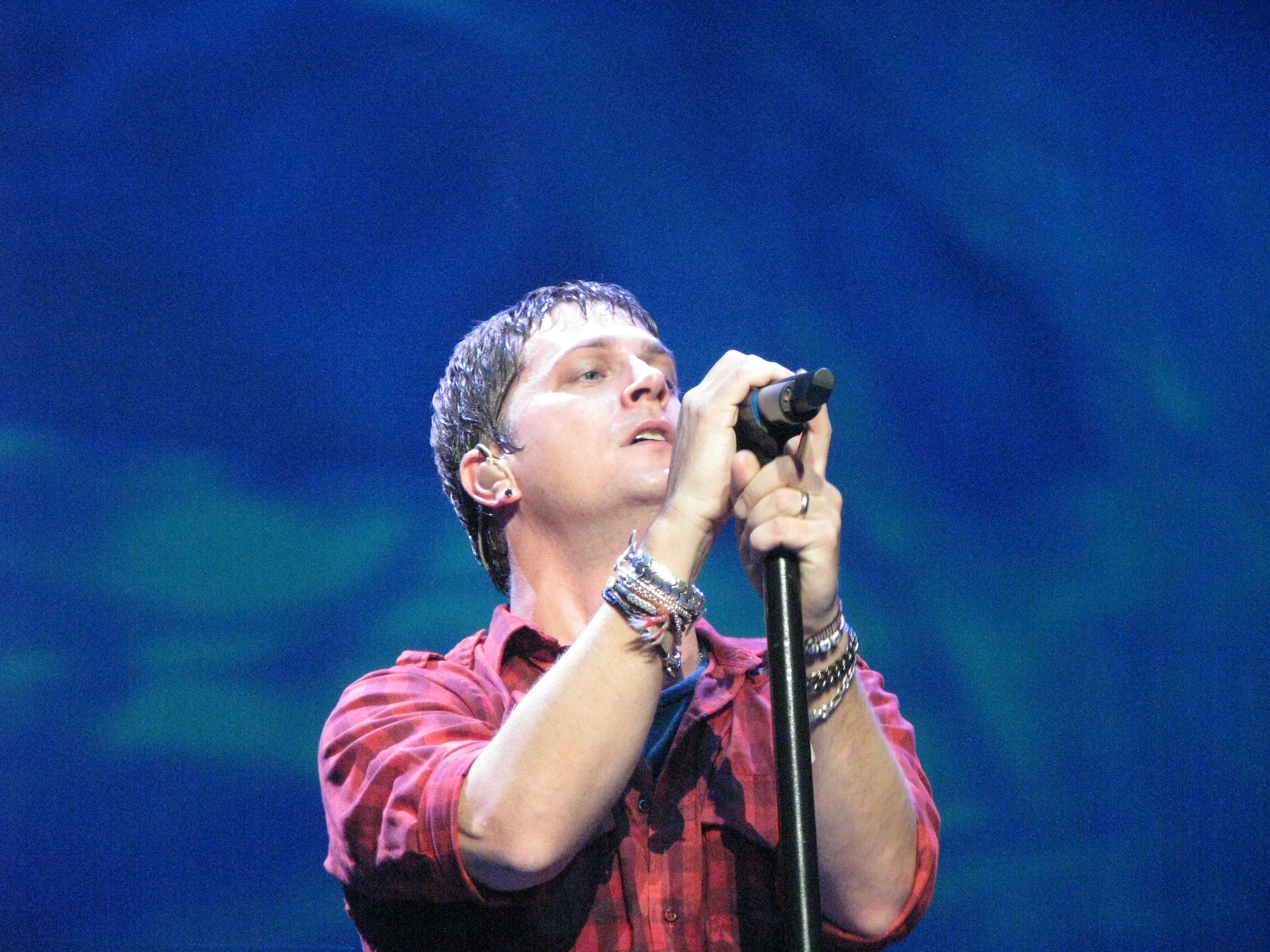
Thomas performing at the Fox Theatre in Atlanta

Date	City	Country	Venue
North America
September 18, 2009	Tempe	United States	Tempe Beach Park Amphitheatre
September 23, 2009	Hollywood	United States	Hard Rock Live
September 25, 2009	Orlando	United States	Hard Rock Live
September 26, 2009	Clearwater	United States	Ruth Eckerd Hall
September 28, 2009	Cary	United States	Koka Booth Amphitheatre
September 29, 2009	Charlotte	United States	Uptown Amphitheatre
September 30, 2009	Atlanta	United States	Fox Theatre
October 4, 2009	Houston	United States	Verizon Wireless Theater
October 5, 2009	Grand Prairie	United States	Verizon Theatre at Grand Prairie
October 7, 2009	Oklahoma City	United States	Ford Center
October 9, 2009	Council Bluffs	United States	Harrah's Stir Concert Cove
October 10, 2009	Milwaukee	United States	Riverside Theater
October 11, 2009	Saint Paul	United States	Xcel Energy Center
October 14, 2009	Vancouver	Canada	The Centre in Vancouver for Performing Arts
October 15, 2009	Seattle	United States	WaMu Theater
October 17, 2009	Reno	United States	Reno Events Center
October 18, 2009	San Jose	United States	Event Center Arena
October 20, 2009	Los Angeles	United States	Gibson Amphitheatre
October 21, 2009	San Diego	United States	SDSU Open Air Theatre
October 23, 2009	Temecula	United States	Pechanga Showroom Theater
October 24, 2009	Las Vegas	United States	Pearl Concert Theater
October 25, 2009	Tucson	United States	Tucson Music Hall
October 27, 2009	Denver	United States	Magness Arena
October 29, 2009	Kansas City	United States	Midland Theatre
October 30, 2009	Hammond	United States	The Venue at Hammond Horseshoe
October 31, 2009	St. Louis	United States	Fox Theatre
November 2, 2009	Detroit	United States	The Fillmore Detroit
November 4, 2009	Toronto	Canada	Massey Hall
November 9, 2009	Boston	United States	Wang Theatre
November 10, 2009	Fairfax	United States	Patriot Center
November 12, 2009	New York City	United States	Beacon Theatre
November 13, 2009	New York City	United States	Beacon Theatre
November 14, 2009	New York City	United States	Beacon Theatre
December 3, 2009	Bossier City	United States	Riverdome
December 4, 2009	Tunica	United States	Tunica Events Center
December 5, 2009	Biloxi	United States	Studio A
December 8, 2009	Verona	United States	Turning Stone Event Center
December 18, 2009	Uncasville	United States	Mohegan Sun Arena
January 9, 2010	Atlantic City	United States	Borgata Event Center
Australia
February 5, 2010	Melbourne	Australia	Rod Laver Arena
February 6, 2010^{[A]}	Portarlington	Australia	Scotchmans Hill
February 7, 2010^{[A]}	Adelaide	Australia	Leconfield Wines Estate
February 10, 2010	Brisbane	Australia	Brisbane Entertainment Centre
February 12, 2010	Pokolbin	Australia	Hope Estate Winery Amphitheatre
February 13, 2010	Pokolbin	Australia	Hope Estate Winery Amphitheatre
February 14, 2010^{[A]}	Bowral	Australia	Centennial Vineyards
February 17, 2010	Sydney	Australia	Acer Arena
February 19, 2010	Canberra	Australia	Royal Theatre
February 20, 2010^{[A]}	Yarra Valley	Australia	Rochford Wines Estate
February 21, 2010^{[A]}	Caversham	Australia	Sandalford Wines Estate
North America; Sidewalk Angels Foundation—Summer Tour 2010
June 25, 2010^{[B]}	Endicott	United States	En-Joie Golf Course
July 2, 2010^{[C]}	Chicago	United States	Petrillo Music Shell
July 10, 2010^{[D]}	Orlando	United States	Universal Music Plaza Stage
July 15, 2010	Orillia	Canada	Casino Rama Entertainment Centre
July 16, 2010	Hinckley	United States	Grand Casino Hinckley Amphitheater
July 24, 2010	Niagara Falls	United States	Seneca Niagara Events Center
August 6, 2010	Temecula	United States	Pechanga Showroom Theater
August 7, 2010	Indio	United States	Fantasy Springs Special Events Center
August 9, 2010	Friant	United States	Table Mountain Event Center
August 11, 2010	Worley	United States	Coeur d'Alene Casino Resort Event Center
August 12, 2010	Snoqualmie	United States	Mountain View Plaza
August 14, 2010	Las Vegas	United States	Sandbar at Red Rock
August 15, 2010	Saratoga	United States	Mountain Winery
August 20, 2010	Atlantic City	United States	Borgata Music Box
August 21, 2010	Atlantic City	United States	Borgata Music Box
August 22, 2010	Atlantic City	United States	Borgata Music Box
August 24, 2010	Uncasville	United States	Mohegan Sun Arena
August 27, 2010	Tunica	United States	Tunica Events Center
August 28, 2010	Biloxi	United States	Studio A

Festivals and other miscellaneous performances

^{A} These concerts were a part of the "A Day on the Green Festival"
^{B} This event was a part of the "2010 Dick's Sporting Goods Open"
^{C} This event was a part of the "2010 Taste of Chicago"
^{D} This event was a part of the "2010 Universal Studios Orlando Summer Concert Series

=== Box office score data ===
Venue	City	Tickets sold / available	Gross revenue
Ruth Eckerd Hall	Clearwater	2,082 / 2,082 (100%)	$145,897
Uptown Amphitheatre	Charlotte	3,075 / 4,983 (62%)	$86,228
Fox Theatre	Atlanta	3,455 / 4,650 (74%)	$191,160
Riverside Theater	Milwaukee	2,395 / 2,428 (99%)	$122,539
Xcel Energy Center	Saint Paul	4,368 / 4,368 (100%)	$231,620
Event Center Arena	San Jose	2,554 / 3,425 (74%)	$142,110
Gibson Amphitheatre	Los Angeles	5,451 / 5,969 (91%)	$209,385
Magness Arena	Denver	4,453 / 5,330 (83%)	$189,212
The Venue at Hammond Horseshoe	Hammond	2,206 / 2,206 (100%)	$126,575
Fox Theatre	St. Louis	2,656 / 3,943 (67%)	$143,700
The Fillmore Detroit	Detroit	2,886 / 2,886 (100%)	$109,712
Massey Hall	Toronto	2,511 / 2,511 (100%)	$155,002
Wang Theatre	Boston	2,939 / 3,536 (83%)	$128,886
Patriot Center	Fairfax	3,632 / 5,500 (66%)	$188,864
Beacon Theatre	New York City	8,309 / 8,309 (100%)	$552,127
Riverdome	Bossier City	1,276 / 1,400 (91%)	$85,137
Tunica Events Center	Tunica	4,161 / 4,850 (86%)	$256,246
Mohegan Sun Arena	Uncasville	6,990 / 6,994 (~100%)	$231,564
Rod Laver Arena	Melbourne	9,800 / 10,500 (93%)	$969,267
Brisbane Entertainment Centre	Brisbane	8,243 / 8,830 (93%)	$953,729
Hope Estate Winery Amphitheatre	Pokolbin	15,701 / 25,337 62%)	$1,327,790
Acer Arena	Sydney	7,705 / 7,941 (97%)	$845,556
Royal Theatre	Canberra	2,863 / 4,530 (63%)	$242,762
TOTAL		112,236 / 135,972 (82%)	$7,749,662

== Broadcasts and recordings ==
For the tour, Thomas' created USB wristbands that included highlights of songs from the tour. Fans were able to vote on the songs included on the wristbands. Entitled the "Best of…cradlesong tour", the USB included 30 songs from various concerts on the first North American and Australian leg of the tour. An additional USB wristband was made available for the Sidewalk Angels tour.
