= Something to Be Tour =

2005–06 concert tour by Rob Thomas

- Tour by Rob Thomas
- Promotional poster for the tour
- Associated album: ...Something to Be
- Start date: April 15, 2005
- End date: July 8, 2006
- Legs: 7
- No. of shows: 98 in North America; 4 in Europe; 11 in Australia; 2 in Japan; 116 total

Rob Thomas concert chronology
- Something to Be Tour (2005–06); Cradlesong Tour (2009–10)

The Something to Be Tour was the debut concert tour by American recording artist and Matchbox Twenty frontman, Rob Thomas. Visiting numerous countries in North America, Europe, Australia and Asia, the tour supported his first solo record, ...Something to Be. The tour began in April 2005, shortly after the release of the album. As the popularity of the album grew, the tour venues progressed from nightclubs to theatres to arenas and amphitheaters.

== Background ==
One thing I’ve been really excited about since we started is taking this thing from the record to the stage. This has always sounded like a record that was going to be really great live. The show is going to be something of its own animal, and I’m excited about seeing it grow…

Shortly after ending the More Than You Think You Are Tour with Matchbox Twenty, Rob Thomas began recording his solo effort. Described as a fusion of adult contemporary and pop music, the album was tooled to distinguish Thomas from his popular band. As the first single hit airwaves, Thomas announced he would embark on a mini-club tour in the United States to help promote the record. Thomas wanted to focus on his solo material but understood that many fans of Matchbox Twenty would also be in the audience. He remarked, "I play the matchbox songs in the way I wrote them Then I don't use any of other parts the guys wrote. You want to ride that line because some of the fans came because they are fans of [M]atchbox [T]wenty and then there has to be that [musical] element of the reason you are on a break" As the popularity of the single grew, Thomas expanded his tour to England, Germany, Australia and Japan. Additionally, Thomas performed at several notable concert events including Live 8 in Philadelphia.

"The tour was amazing. That was, I think, just a really big…you know the only bad thing about it was there were only ten shows and we were done and we were ready for more. But I mean, I think it's been great. A lot of these songs were the kind of songs that, as you’re writing them and recording them, you’re thinking about you know you want to play them live. So a lot of them were born to be good live songs too." In October 2005, Thomas embarked on a full throttle tour of the U.S. performing in theatres. From there, Thomas journeyed to Australia to begin his trek into arenas. During the summer of 2006, Thomas co-headlined the tour with singer, Jewel. Many of Thomas' concerts benefited the Sweet Relief Musicians Fund and victims of Hurricane Katrina.

== Opening acts ==
- Beth Hart (North America—Leg 1)
- Lisa Miskovsky (Europe)
- Antigone Rising (North America—Leg 2) (select shows)
- Anna Nalick (North America—Leg 2) (select shows)
- John Nicholls (North America—Leg 3, Vermont)
- Jewel (North America—Leg 4) (select shows)
- Jason Mraz (North America—Leg 4) (select shows)
- Toby Lightman (North America—Leg 4) (select shows)

== Setlist ==
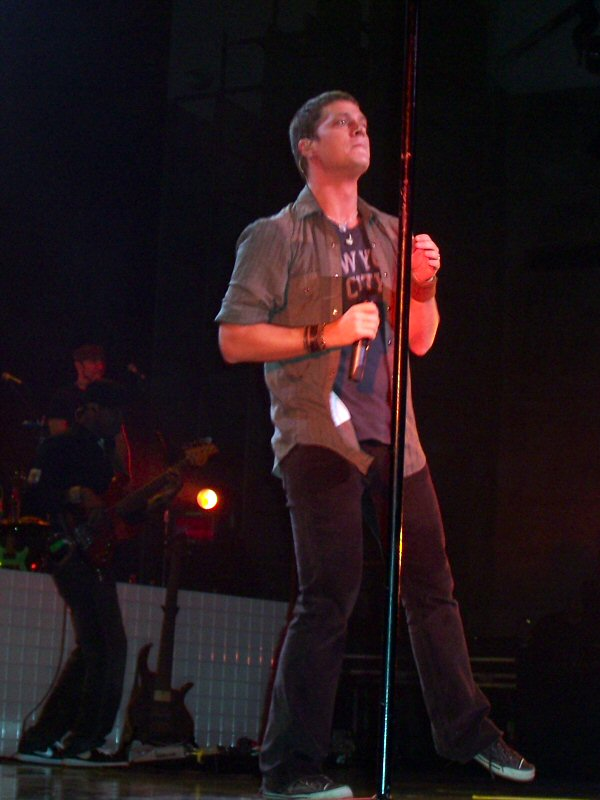
Thomas performing in Fresno

Spring/Summer 2005

North America

1. "...Something to Be"
2. "Fallin' to Pieces"
3. "Not Just a Woman"
4. "3 A.M." (contains excerpts from "The Joker")
5. "When the Heartache Ends"
6. "Lonely No More"
7. "Streetcorner Symphony" (contains elements of "Easy")
8. "Problem Girl"
9. "Dear Joan"
10. "Ain't No Sunshine"
11. "You Know Me"
12. "This Is How a Heart Breaks"

Encore

13. "Push"
14. "Real World"
15. "Smooth"
16. "I Am an Illusion"

Europe/Australia/Japan

1. "...Something to Be"
2. "Fallin' to Pieces"
3. "Ever the Same"
4. "3 A.M." (contains excerpts from "The Joker")
5. "When the Heartache Ends"
6. "Lonely No More"
7. "Streetcorner Symphony" (contains elements of "Easy")
8. "Problem Girl"
9. "Dear Joan"
10. "Ain't No Sunshine"
11. "You Know Me"
12. "I Am an Illusion"

Encore

13. "Push"
14. "Wonderwall"
15. "Smooth"
16. "This Is How a Heart Breaks"
Fall 2005
1. "...Something to Be"
2. "Fallin' to Pieces"
3. "Ever the Same"
4. "3 A.M." (contains excerpts from "The Joker")
5. "When the Heartache Ends"
6. "Lonely No More"
7. "Streetcorner Symphony" (contains elements of "Easy")
8. "Problem Girl"
9. "Dear Joan"
10. "Ain't No Sunshine"
11. "You Know Me"
12. "I Am an Illusion"

Encore

13. "Borderline"
14. "Smooth"
15. "This Is How a Heart Breaks"
2006
1. "...Something to Be"
2. "Fallin' to Pieces"
3. "If You're Gone"
4. "When the Heartache Ends"
5. "Ever the Same"
6. "Not Just a Woman"
7. "3 A.M."
8. "You Won't Be Mine"
9. "The Difference"
10. "My, My, My" (contains excerpts from "Dear Joan")
11. "Problem Girl"
12. "The Chain"
13. "Streetcorner Symphony"
14. "Let's Dance"
15. "Lonely No More"
16. "I Am an Illusion"

Encore

17. "Unwell"
18. "Smooth" (contains elements of "Guajira")
19. "You Know Me" (contains excerpts from "Burning Down the House")
20. "This Is How a Heart Breaks"

=== Additional notes ===
- During the European leg, "Time After Time" replaced "Push" during performances in Germany.
- During the first Australian leg, Thomas performed "Father Figure" during the encore section.
- During the performances at the Rod Laver Arena in Melbourne, Victoria, Australia; Thomas performed "Bright Lights" in lieu of "The Chain".
- During the performance at Challenge Stadium in Perth, Western Australia, Australia; Thomas performed "Dancing in the Dark" in lieu of "You Know Me".
- For the final North American leg, Thomas performed "Stop Draggin' My Heart Around" as a duet with Jewel. The song was performed in lieu of "The Chain"
- During the performance at the Red Rocks Amphitheatre in Morrison, Colorado; Thomas performed "Now Comes the Night" in lieu of "Unwell".

== Tour dates ==
Date	City	Country	Venue	Opening Act
North America
April 15, 2005	San Francisco	United States	The Fillmore	Beth Hart
April 16, 2005	Ventura	United States	Ventura Theater	Beth Hart
April 19, 2005	Los Angeles	United States	Avalon Theatre	Beth Hart
April 20, 2005	Las Vegas	United States	The Joint	Beth Hart
April 22, 2005	St. Louis	United States	Roberts Orpheum Theatre	Beth Hart
April 23, 2005	Columbus	United States	Promowest Pavilion	Beth Hart
April 24, 2005	Chicago	United States	The Vic Theatre	Beth Hart
April 26, 2005	Philadelphia	United States	Electric Factory	Beth Hart
April 27, 2005	New York City	United States	Fillmore New York at Irving Plaza	Beth Hart
April 29, 2005	Boston	United States	Avalon Ballroom	Beth Hart
April 30, 2005	Washington, D.C.	United States	9:30 Club	Beth Hart
Europe
June 20, 2005	Manchester	England	Manchester Academy	Lisa Miskovsky
June 22, 2005	London	England	Astoria Theatre	Lisa Miskovsky
June 23, 2005	Cologne	Germany	Gloria-Theater	Lisa Miskovsky
June 24, 2005	Berlin	Germany	Fritzclub im Postbahnhof	Lisa Miskovsky
Australia
July 17, 2005	Sydney	Australia	The Metro Theatre	N/A
July 18, 2005	Melbourne	Australia	Mercury Lounge	N/A
Asia
July 20, 2005	Tokyo	Japan	Shibuya Club Quattro	N/A
July 21, 2005	Osaka	Japan	Shinsaibashi Club Quattro	N/A
North America
October 5, 2005	Albany	United States	Palace Theatre	Antigone Rising
October 8, 2005	Upper Darby Township	United States	Tower Theater	Antigone Rising
October 9, 2005	Pittsburgh	United States	Heinz Hall for the Performing Arts	Antigone Rising
October 11, 2005	Boston	United States	Orpheum Theatre	Antigone Rising
October 12, 2005	Verona	United States	Turning Stone Event Center	Antigone Rising
October 14, 2005	Wallingford	United States	Chevrolet Theatre	Antigone Rising
October 15, 2005	Uncasville	United States	Mohegan Sun Arena	Antigone Rising
October 16, 2005	Washington, D.C.	United States	DAR Constitution Hall	Antigone Rising
October 18, 2005	New York City	United States	Beacon Theatre	Antigone Rising
October 19, 2005	New York City	United States	Beacon Theatre	Antigone Rising
October 21, 2005	Newark	United States	Prudential Hall	Antigone Rising
October 22, 2005	Atlantic City	United States	Borgata Events Center	Antigone Rising
October 24, 2005	Atlanta	United States	The Tabernacle	Antigone Rising
October 25, 2005	Melbourne	United States	King Center for the Performing Arts	Antigone Rising
October 28, 2005	Memphis	United States	Mud Island Amphitheatre	Antigone Rising
October 29, 2005	Houston	United States	Verizon Wireless Theater	Antigone Rising
October 30, 2005	Grand Prairie	United States	Nokia Live at Grand Prairie	Antigone Rising
November 1, 2005	Denver	United States	Wells Fargo Theatre	Antigone Rising
November 2, 2005	West Valley City	United States	Ford Theatre at E Center	Antigone Rising
November 4, 2005	Tucson	United States	AVA Amphitheater	Antigone Rising
November 5, 2005	Phoenix	United States	Arizona Veterans Memorial Coliseum	Antigone Rising
November 6, 2005	Bakersfield	United States	Fox Theater	Anna Nalick
November 8, 2005	Portland	United States	Arlene Schnitzer Concert Hall	Anna Nalick
November 9, 2005	Seattle	United States	Paramount Theatre	Anna Nalick
November 11, 2005	Sacramento	United States	Sacramento Memorial Auditorium	Anna Nalick
November 12, 2005	Fresno	United States	Saroyan Theatre	Anna Nalick
November 13, 2005	Reno	United States	Reno Events Center	Anna Nalick
November 15, 2005	Los Angeles	United States	Wiltern Theatre	Anna Nalick
November 16, 2005	Los Angeles	United States	Wiltern Theatre	Anna Nalick
November 17, 2005	San Diego	United States	Copley Symphony Hall	Anna Nalick
November 19, 2005	Temecula	United States	Pechanga Showroom Theater	Anna Nalick
November 20, 2005	Oakland	United States	Paramount Theatre	Anna Nalick
November 25, 2005	Cleveland	United States	Palace Theatre	Anna Nalick
November 26, 2005	Cincinnati	United States	Taft Theatre	Anna Nalick
November 27, 2005	Louisville	United States	Palace Theatre	Anna Nalick
November 29, 2005	Minneapolis	United States	Orpheum Theatre	Anna Nalick
November 30, 2005	Milwaukee	United States	Riverside Theater	Anna Nalick
December 1, 2005	Fort Wayne	United States	Embassy Theatre	Anna Nalick
December 3, 2005	Kansas City	United States	Uptown Theater	Anna Nalick
December 4, 2005	Des Moines	United States	Civic Center of Greater Des Moines	Anna Nalick
December 5, 2005	Chicago	United States	Auditorium Theatre	Anna Nalick
December 9, 2005	Toronto	Canada	Roy Thomson Hall	Anna Nalick
December 10, 2005	Detroit	United States	Masonic Temple Theatre	Anna Nalick
Australia
February 13, 2006	Adelaide	Australia	Adelaide Entertainment Centre	N/A
February 14, 2006	Melbourne	Australia	Rod Laver Arena	N/A
February 15, 2006	Melbourne	Australia	Rod Laver Arena	N/A
February 17, 2006	Newcastle	Australia	Newcastle Entertainment Centre	N/A
February 18, 2006	Sydney	Australia	Sydney Entertainment Centre	N/A
February 19, 2006	Wollongong	Australia	WIN Entertainment Centre	N/A
February 21, 2006	Canberra	Australia	NCCC Royal Theatre	N/A
February 23, 2006	Brisbane	Australia	Brisbane Entertainment Centre	N/A
February 25, 2006	Perth	Australia	Challenge Stadium	N/A
North America
March 7, 2006	Burlington	United States	Burlington Memorial Auditorium	John Nicholls
March 8, 2006	Portland	United States	Merrill Auditorium	John Nicholls
March 10, 2006	Moncton	Canada	Moncton Coliseum	John Nicholls
March 11, 2006	Saint John	Canada	Harbour Station	John Nicholls
March 12, 2006	Halifax	Canada	Halifax Metro Centre	John Nicholls
March 14, 2006	Montreal	Canada	Bell Centre	John Nicholls
March 15, 2006	Ottawa	Canada	Scotiabank Place	John Nicholls
March 16, 2006	London	Canada	John Labatt Centre	John Nicholls
March 18, 2006	Kitchener	Canada	Kitchener Memorial Auditorium	John Nicholls
March 19, 2006	Hamilton	Canada	Hamilton Place Theatre	John Nicholls
March 23, 2006	Duluth	United States	DECC Auditorium	John Nicholls
March 24, 2006	Sioux City	United States	Orpheum Theatre	John Nicholls
March 26, 2006	Bozeman	United States	Theatre at the Brick	John Nicholls
March 27, 2006	Nampa	United States	Idaho Center Theater	John Nicholls
March 28, 2006	Spokane	United States	Spokane Opera House	John Nicholls
March 30, 2006	Victoria	Canada	Save-On-Foods Memorial Centre	John Nicholls
March 31, 2006	Vancouver	Canada	Queen Elizabeth Theatre	John Nicholls
April 1, 2006	Kelowna	Canada	Prospera Place	John Nicholls
April 3, 2006	Edmonton	Canada	Northern Alberta Jubilee Auditorium	John Nicholls
April 4, 2006	Calgary	Canada	Southern Alberta Jubilee Auditorium	John Nicholls
April 6, 2006	Winnipeg	Canada	MTS Centre	John Nicholls
May 23, 2006	Clearwater	United States	Ruth Eckerd Hall	
May 24, 2006	Boca Raton	United States	Count de Hoernele Amphitheatre	
May 25, 2006	Orlando	United States	TD Waterhouse Centre	
May 27, 2006	Jacksonville	United States	Metropolitan Park	
May 28, 2006	Anderson	United States	Civic Center of Anderson	
May 29, 2006	Atlanta	United States	Chastain Park Amphitheater	
May 31, 2006	Portsmouth	United States	NTELOS Pavilion	
June 2, 2006	Atlantic City	United States	Borgata Events Center	
June 3, 2006	Atlantic City	United States	Borgata Events Center	
June 4, 2006	Uncasville	United States	Mohegan Sun Arena	
June 6, 2006	Columbia	United States	Merriweather Post Pavilion	
June 7, 2006	Scranton	United States	Toyota Pavilion at Montage Mountain	
June 9, 2006	Boston	United States	Bank of America Pavilion	
June 10, 2006	Wantagh	United States	Nikon at Jones Beach Theater	
June 11, 2006	Holmdel Township	United States	PNC Bank Arts Center	
June 12, 2006	Cleveland	United States	Plain Dealer Pavilion	
June 13, 2006	Columbus	United States	PromoWest Pavilion	
June 14, 2006	Cuyahoga Falls	United States	Blossom Music Center	
June 15, 2006	Clarkston	United States	DTE Energy Music Theatre	
June 17, 2006	Chicago	United States	Charter One Pavilion	
June 18, 2006	Minneapolis	United States	Northrop Auditorium	
June 20, 2006	Nashville	United States	Gaylord Entertainment Center	
June 21, 2006	Pelham	United States	Verizon Wireless Music Center	
June 23, 2006	Austin	United States	The Backyard	
June 24, 2006	The Woodlands	United States	Cynthia Woods Mitchell Pavilion	
June 25, 2006	Hidalgo	United States	Dodge Arena	
June 28, 2006	Morrison	United States	Red Rocks Amphitheatre	
June 30, 2006	Las Vegas	United States	The Joint	
July 1, 2006	Anaheim	United States	The Theater at Arrowhead	
July 2, 2006	Santa Barbara	United States	Santa Barbara Bowl	
July 5, 2006	San Diego	United States	Embarcadero Marina Park	
July 7, 2006	Murphys	United States	Ironstone Amphitheatre	
July 8, 2006	Kelseyville	United States	Konocti Field Amphitheatre	

Cancellations and rescheduled shows

October 7, 2005	Providence, Rhode Island	Providence Theater	Cancelled
October 26, 2005	Hollywood, Florida	Hard Rock Live	Cancelled due to Hurricane Wilma
October 28, 2005	Biloxi, Mississippi	Hard Rock Live Biloxi	Cancelled due to reconstruction due to Hurricane Katrina

== Broadcasts and recordings ==
The summer tour was filmed at the Red Rocks Amphitheatre in Morrison, Colorado. Initially filmed for a PBS Soundstage special, the concert was later released on DVD, entitled, "Something to Be Tour—Live at Red Rocks". The performances of "My, My, My" and "Stop Draggin' My Heart Around". A special performance of "Bent" took the place of "My, My, My" and the acoustic, "Now Comes the Night" was performed for the taping instead of "Push".
