= All Night Days =

Studio album by Rob Thomas
- Released: September 5, 2025
- Length: 32:50
- Label: Universal
- Producers: Benzi Edelson; Grant Michaels; Pom Pom; Eugene Veltman; Gregg Wattenberg

Rob Thomas chronology
Something About Christmas Time (2021)	All Night Days (2025)

Singles from All Night Days
- 1. "Hard to Be Happy / Thrill Me" Released: July 11, 2025; 2. "Picture Perfect" Released: August 8, 2025

All Night Days is the sixth studio album by American singer Rob Thomas. It was released by Universal Records on September 5, 2025. This is his first album in four years, and first full-length studio album of all original material since 2019's Chip Tooth Smile. It is his first release under Universal Records,.

== Background ==
Thomas began working on the album in 2020 during the COVID-19 pandemic and planned to release it during the first few years of the decade. Around this time Matchbox Twenty began working on a new album. Some of the songs intended for this record ended up being on the band's album and vice versa. Because time passed since he began working on the album, he ended up writing new songs and replacing some of the original tracks. The album was going to be released by his former label of thirty years, Atlantic, but after not agreeing with them with talk of restructuring his deal and doing things he did not want to do, they let him go from the label, taking the album with him. He soon signed with Universal. He announced the album in May 2025.

== Release and promotion ==
All Night Days was released on September 5, 2025. Thomas is currently promoting the album on the All Night Days Tour which began on August 1, 2025.

=== Singles ===
"Hard to Be Happy" and "Thrill Me" was released as the album's lead single as a double-A-side on July 11, 2025.

== Commercial performance ==
All Night Days debuted at number 133 on the US Billboard 200 selling 9,000 pure album sales.

== Track listing ==
All Night Days track listing
No.	Title	Writer(s)	Producer(s)	Length
1.	"Hand in My Hand"	Rob Thomas; Kellen Pomerannz; Gregg Wattenberg	Wattenberg; Pom Pom	3:35
2.	"All Night Days"	Thomas; Remy Gautreau; Grant Michaels; Wattenberg	Wattenberg; Michaels	3:03
3.	"Hard to Be Happy"	Thomas; Todd Clark; Derek Fuhrmann	Wattenberg; Michaels	3:42
4.	"I Believe It"	Thomas; Kyle Cook; Paul Doucette; Wattenberg; Brian Yale	Wattenberg	2:58
5.	"Thrill Me"	Thomas	Wattenberg	2:38
6.	"Picture Perfect"	Thomas; Wattenberg	Wattenberg; Benzi Edelson	3:38
7.	"Machine"	Thomas; Wattenberg	Wattenberg; Michaels	2:40
8.	"No Good at Loving You"	Thomas	Wattenberg; Michaels	3:00
9.	"Ghost"	Thomas; Jesse Fink; Eugene Veltman; Wattenberg	Wattenberg; Veltman	2:45
10.	"Losing My Mind"	Thomas	Wattenberg; Edelson	2:28
11.	"Back to the Start"	Thomas; Edelson; Wattenberg	Wattenberg; Edelson	2:23
Total length:				32:50

== Personnel ==
- Rob Thomas – lead vocals (all tracks), additional vocals (tracks 4, 5, 8, 10), guitar (8), background vocals (9)
- Andrew Maury – mixing
- Joe LaPorta – mastering
- Dan McDonald – engineering (all tracks), percussion (2, 10); additional vocals, drums, programming (7)
- Ethan Feinberg – engineering assistance
- Gregg Wattenberg – guitar (1–10), additional vocals (1–8, 10), programming (1, 2, 4–10), bass (2, 6, 7), keyboards (2), synthesizer (3, 7), piano (5), percussion (10)
- Al Carty – bass (1, 3, 4, 7, 9)
- Abe Fogle – drums (1, 3, 4, 7, 9), percussion (4)
- Chris Evans – guitar (1)
- Pom Pom – programming (1)
- Grant Michaels – programming (2, 7, 8), keyboards (2), guitar (3, 8), synthesizer (3, 7, 8), piano (5), additional vocals (8)
- Maison Thomas – guitar (2, 3, 6, 10)
- Gunnar Olsen – drums (2, 6, 7)
- Jenny Douglas-Foote – additional vocals (3, 4, 6, 7)
- Vivian Sessoms – additional vocals (3, 4, 6, 7)
- Mia Wattenberg – additional vocals (3)
- Kyle Cook – piano (4, 8)
- Craig Rosen – percussion (5, 10, 11)
- Benzi Edelson – programming (6, 10), keyboards (6); bass, drums, engineering (11)
- Kevin Killen – engineering (7)
- Jeff Allen – bass (8)
- Matt Beck – guitar (9)
- Eugene Veltman – programming (9)

== Charts ==
Chart performance for All Night Days
Chart (2025)	Peak position
Australian Albums (ARIA)	37
US Billboard 200	133
