= Cradlesong (album) =

Studio album by Rob Thomas
- Released: June 30, 2009
- Recorded: 2007–09
- Genre: Pop rock
- Length: 52:34
- Label: Emblem, Atlantic
- Producer: Matt Serletic

Rob Thomas chronology
...Something to Be (2005)	Cradlesong (2009)	The Great Unknown (2015)

Singles from Cradlesong
- 1. "Her Diamonds" Released: April 22, 2009; 2. "Give Me the Meltdown" Released: June 9, 2009; 3. "Someday" Released: December 1, 2009; 4. "Mockingbird" Released: April 20, 2010; 5. "Real World '09" Released: July 30, 2010

Cradlesong is the second solo studio album by Matchbox Twenty lead-singer Rob Thomas, released on June 30, 2009, by Atlantic Records. The album's first single "Her Diamonds" was a success around the world, while reaching number three in Australia and topping the Billboard Hot Adult Top 40 Tracks chart, meanwhile other singles "Someday" and "Mockingbird" attained success on the Adult Contemporary charts.

The album received mostly positive reviews, with the single "Her Diamonds", a song written about his wife and her illness, receiving praise by many reviewers. The album takes a pop rock feel with a variety of sounds mixed by longtime producer Matt Serletic who is praised for smooth production of the album. It debuted on the US Billboard 200 at number #3 selling 122,000 copies, while reaching top-ten positions in Canada and Australia.

== Background ==
On September 15, 2008, Thomas told Billboard.com that he's "probably about 80 percent done" with his second solo record, tentatively titled Cradle Songs at the time. Thomas characterized the album as "the usual mish-mosh of styles, but hopefully just holding true to a bunch of good songs." with the article also mentioning that the record will nonetheless feature several tracks that "take a more global, rhythmic direction after working with South American and African percussionists." Thomas explained one such experiment:

We started off with the idea of doing a newer version of (Paul Simon's) The Rhythm of the Saints, and that kinda carried us a long way through. It gave us a whole new bed to work with, like 'How do I get my pop sensibility around this and work it into that?' It was a lot of fun. But you go through different phases when you're writing; it took a different turn, and I just followed it, too.

On February 25, 2009, it was announced via Fox News that the album's then-supposed title was Cradle Song. It was mentioned, in addition, that there "are at least four hot singles awaiting radio play including 'Her Diamonds' and 'Someday.'" On the same day, Thomas announced on his official website that he has been "back and forth to Los Angeles quite a bit, mixing the new record." However, he denied the album will be released in May, mentioning it "looks like it won't be coming until the last week of June or the first week of July."

On March 2, 2009, Clark Collis of Entertainment Weekly interviewed Thomas, where he confirmed he has since shelved his initial efforts to evoke The Rhythm of the Saints, and claimed the album is scheduled for a June 30 release. Having played half the forthcoming album to Entertainment Weekly, it was reported that many of the lyrics on Cradle Song center around troubled relationships, and three more song titles were revealed: "Meltdown" (described as "INXS-esque power pop" that stood out as "a possible first single"), "Fire on the Mountain" (an "epic, tribal drum-driven" track inspired by Dave Eggers' book "What Is the What: The Autobiography of Valentino Achak Deng") and the melancholic country-leaning "Getting Late" (suggested as the "set's likely closer" and what Thomas described as "a little ditty about death." in the vein of Tom Petty and Willie Nelson.) The proper magazine article added that "Someday" is a power ballad with a tinkling piano introduction reminiscent of 1980s band Damn Yankees.

On March 4, 2009, Thomas clarified on the message board of his official web-site that the album's title will be one word: "cradlesong". He announced that the lead single for this album had been chosen and a director is being sought after for the video. Thomas also announced that, at the time, he had mixed eleven songs so far and had recorded a total of twenty-seven. He confirmed a total of twelve songs will make the final cut, but added "the first pressing will have an extra 3 on it as well" and "later in the year i'm going to try to find a way to release the others, but i'll keep popping them out here and there at shows."

On March 6, 2009, minute-long snippets of the tracks "Meltdown" and "Her Diamonds" were temporarily featured on the front page of his official site. Despite being removed from the website, they are presently being featured in a RateTheMusic survey.

On April 27, 2009, the first single "Her Diamonds" was released on iTunes. The song is about his wife Marisol and her longtime illness. This was followed by "Give Me the Meltdown" on June 9, "Someday" on June 16, and "Fire on the Mountain" on June 23. All four singles were released before the album's release date on June 30, 2009. "Someday" featured in promo spots for NBC's 2009 fall season of The Biggest Loser.

Rob kicked off his Cradlesong Tour in Hollywood, Florida starting on September 23, 2009, at the Hard Rock Live.

== Critical reception ==
Professional ratings
Aggregate scores
Source	Rating
Metacritic	73/100
Review scores
Source	Rating
AllMusic	3.5/5 stars
Billboard	(favourable)
The Boston Globe	(positive)
Entertainment Weekly	C+
Los Angeles Times	3/4 stars
The New York Times	(favorable)
Rolling Stone	4/5 stars
USA Today	3/4 stars

Cradlesong received generally positive reviews from music critics. At Metacritic, which assigns a normalized rating out of 100 to reviews from mainstream critics, the album received an average score of 73, based on 7 reviews, which indicates "generally favorable reviews".

Billboard review said that "Thomas returns with a soaring collection of infectious pop songs that are destined for heavy rotation in 2009 and beyond". AllMusic also gave a positive review: "This dogged sense of purpose does result in a tighter, better record than Something to Be and even it's not a lot of fun, it's not meant to be: it's big music about big issues, even inflating personal issues to the universal".

Rolling Stone stated that "There is plenty of unexpected texture to keep your ears engaged". Los Angeles Times stated that "Thomas presides over a sleekly produced, constantly undulating mixture of sounds that seems designed to appeal to all of the people all of the time".

The New York Times review considered Cradlesong his second persistently polite, numbingly polished solo album". The Boston Globe stated, "The Matchbox Twenty frontman's second solo album showcases all of his admirable middle-of-the-road gifts and offers a glimpse of the possibilities when he explores the more extreme edges".

== Chart performance ==
Cradlesong made a positive debut on the Billboard 200 at number #3, selling 122,000 copies while "Her Diamonds" ascended up the Billboard Hot 100 to a peak of 23. As of July 12, 2015, Cradlesong has sold 493,000 copies in the United States.

== Track listing ==
All tracks are written by Rob Thomas, except where noted.

No.	Title	Writer(s)	Length
1.	"Her Diamonds"		4:38
2.	"Gasoline"		3:55
3.	"Give Me the Meltdown"	Thomas; Matt Serletic	3:12
4.	"Someday"	Thomas; Serletic; Shy Carter	4:07
5.	"Mockingbird"		4:00
6.	"Real World '09"	Thomas; Serletic; Nellee Hooper	2:45
7.	"Fire on the Mountain"		5:09
8.	"Hard on You"		2:42
9.	"Still Ain't Over You"		3:09
10.	"Natural"	Thomas; Serletic	4:48
11.	"Snowblind"		3:53
12.	"Wonderful"		3:28
13.	"Cradlesong"		4:13
14.	"Getting Late"		3:27

Bonus track
No.	Title	Length
15.	"Little Wonders" (radio version)	3:33

iTunes bonus tracks
No.	Title	Writer(s)	Length
16.	"Sleep Till the War Is Over"	Thomas; Garfield Mayor	3:58
17.	"Believe"		3:29

German bonus tracks
No.	Title	Writer(s)	Length
18.	"Years from Now"		3:37
19.	"Remembered Well"	Thomas; Frank Romano	3:46

Japanese bonus track
No.	Title	Length
20.	"Overrun" (B-side to "Her Diamonds" single)	4:12

=== Bonus DVD ===
A deluxe edition is available exclusively from Target stores in the US. Included is the original standard studio album, as well as a bonus DVD which includes interviews, plus a behind-the-scenes look at the album photo shoot and video shoot for "Her Diamonds". It can be purchased in said stores or online via Target's website.

== Personnel ==
Musicians

- Rusty Anderson – guitars (3, 5, 11), electric guitar (13)
- Kenny Aronoff – drums (11)
- Stevie Blacke – strings (5)
- Michael Bland – drums (7, 9, 12, 14), snaps (14)
- Marcus Brown – African drums (1, 8)
- Sherree Ford Brown – background vocals (1–6, 8, 11, 13)
- Tom Bukovac – guitars (1–7, 9–12), acoustic guitar (14), bass guitar (4, 9, 14), beat box (4), snaps (14)
- Lenny Castro – percussion (1, 8, 11, 13)
- Jack Daley – bass guitar (2, 3, 5, 6, 11)
- Mark Dobson – percussion (12)
- Keith Fiddmont – alto and tenor saxophones (12)
- Sharlotte Gibson – background vocals (9, 10)
- Soro Gnenemon – African drums (1, 8)
- James Grundler – background vocals (2–7, 9–11, 13)
- Sean Hurley – bass guitar (1, 8, 10)
- Kim Hutchcroft – baritone, bass, and tenor saxophones (12)
- Victor Indrizzo – drums (1, 8, 10), percussion (10)
- Jim Keltner – drums (13)
- Reverend Shuichi Tom Kurai – Taiko drums (1)
- Abe Laboriel Jr. – drums (2–5, 13)
- Michael Landau – guitars (8, 10)
- Taylor Moyer – Taiko drums (1)
- Alfred Ortiz – Taiko drums (1)
- Ben Peeler – guitars (10), steel guitar (10), Bouzouki (13), oud (13), Lap steel guitar (13), Portuguese guitar (13)
- Tim Pierce – guitars (1, 3, 5, 7, 9–12, 14), electric guitar (13), acoustic guitar (13, 14), snaps (14)
- Matt Serletic – keyboards (1–7, 9–11, 13), piano (4, 9, 12), Hammond B3 organ (1, 8, 10, 13), programming (1–13), background vocals (3–7), snaps (14), horn arrangements (12)
- Lee Sklar – bass guitar (13)
- Jimmie Lee Sloas – bass guitar (7, 9, 12)
- Robert Smith – African drums (1, 8)
- Dino Soldo – tenor saxophone (12)
- Magatte Sow – African drums (1, 8)
- Malik Sow – African drums (1, 8)
- Gary St. Germain – Taiko drums (1)
- Bryan Sutton – acoustic guitars (1, 5, 6, 8, 10, 13), mandolin (1, 5, 6, 8, 13)
- Marisol Thomas – background vocals (13)
- Rob Thomas – lead vocals, guitars (2, 3), keyboards (1, 8, 10, 12), Toms (7), background vocals (2–4, 12), snaps (14)
- Lee Thornburg – trumpet (12)
- Robyn Troup – background vocals (1–6, 8–11, 13)
- Jose Vergara – African drums (1, 8)
- Butch Walker – background vocals (4)
- Patrick Warren – piano (12), keyboards (7), Hammond B3 organ (14), chamberlin (5, 7), pump organ (7), snaps (14), string arrangements (5)

Production and design

- Alex Arias – additional Pro Tools editing, assistant engineer
- Keith Armstrong – assistant mix engineer
- Jason Dale – assistant engineer (1, 4–11, 13, 14)
- Mark Dobson – engineer, Pro Tools editing
- Nik Karpen – assistant mix engineer
- Mike Leisz – additional engineering (9), additional Pro Tools editing, assistant engineer
- Ria Lewerke – art direction, design, arrangement, art conception
- Michael Lippman – management
- Chris Lord-Alge – mixing
- Bob Ludwig – mastering
- Andrew McPherson – photography
- Norman Moore – art direction, design
- Seth Morton – assistant engineer (8, 9)
- Justin Niebank – engineer (7, 9, 12, 14)
- Louise Robinson – illustrations
- Andrew Schubert – additional Pro Tools mix editing
- Dean Serletic – production coordination
- Matt Serletic – producer, arranger, vocal arrangements (1–13)
- Dejan Stanjevic – additional engineering (3), assistant engineer (3)
- Jordan Stilwell – assistant engineer (13)
- Jess Sutcliffe – engineer (11), additional engineering (1, 13)
- Shari Sutcliffe – musician and singer contractor
- Marisol Thomas – co-arranger (13)
- Rob Thomas – vocal arrangements (1–13), art concept
- Adam Tilzer – assistant engineer (1, 3, 5, 8, 9, 13)
- Brad Townsend – additional Pro Tools mix editing
- Hal Winer – additional engineering (10, 12, 13), assistant engineer (1, 4, 6, 8, 10–13)
- Patrick Woodward – Pro Tools editing (1, 2, 5, 8, 10, 11, 13), assistant engineer (11)

== Charts and certifications ==
=== Weekly charts ===
Chart (2009)	Peak position
Australian Albums (ARIA)	3
Canadian Albums (Billboard)	8
German Albums (Offizielle Top 100)	40
New Zealand Albums (RMNZ)	17
Swiss Albums (Schweizer Hitparade)	56
UK Albums (OCC)	75
US Billboard 200	3
US Top Rock Albums (Billboard)	1

=== Year-end charts ===
Chart (2009)	Position
Australian Albums (ARIA)	14
US Billboard 200	105
US Top Rock Albums (Billboard)	30
Chart (2010)	Position
Australian Albums (ARIA)	93

=== Certifications ===
Region	Certification	Certified units/sales
Australia (ARIA)	2× Platinum	140,000^{^}
United States (RIAA)	Gold	500,000^{‡}
^{^} Shipments figures based on certification alone.^{‡} Sales+streaming figures based on certification alone.
