= Vntana =

American company

- Industry: Augmented reality
- Founded: 2012
- Founder: Ashley Crowder and Ben Conway
- Headquarters: Van Nuys, California
- Website: www.vntana.com

Vntana (stylized as VNTANA) is an American company that has made see-through displays and currently creates 3D and augmented reality content management systems.

== History ==
In 2012 the company was founded in Los Angeles by Ashley Crowder (the company's CEO) and Ben Conway (the company's COO). The company's name is derived from "ventana", the Spanish word for "window". They developed a display called the "V-3 Hologram System" that consists of hardware and software to project transparent floating images using Pepper's ghost. Their device also includes the ability for users to manipulate the floating images with gestures. The company is headquartered in Van Nuys, California.

== Transparent displays ==
During the 2015 ATP US Open, Mercedes-Benz sponsored a Vntana transparent image of tennis player Roger Federer, to which fans could serve tennis balls. The company has also worked with Pepsi on its marketing campaigns. In 2016 Vntana produced the first transparent image based karaoke device, which was featured on a summer concert tour by Rob Thomas where fans could sing alongside a transparent image of Thomas. It also released a selfie device, in which users can produce transparent images of themselves, called the Hollagram Selfie Booth, created from a full body scan. Users then received a video of the experience. Lexus has also partnered with Vntana in order to provide transparent images of its vehicles at sports stadiums, and during Super Bowl LI events, Vntana provided a SpongeBob SquarePants interactive exhibit for children. The Pro Football Hall of Fame uses Vntana life-size transparent images of its inductees.

== 3D and augmented reality ==
Vntana launched its 3D and augmented reality software platform for online retailers around the time of the COVID-19 pandemic. According to Robin Meyerhoff, the process created “virtual versions of products” for customers to “try on items at home”, or virtual versions of furniture to place around the house, as in the case of Ikea. Vntana creates content management systems for virtual products for company websites. Its suite of software for content management including 3D optimization to enable fast loading of 3D models on eCommerce as well as rendering 2D images and videos to generate marketing content. By 2021 the company had raised $12.5 million in investment from investors including Mark Cuban. That year Vntana became a resident of the New York Fashion Tech Lab. Early clients of the service included Hugo Boss, Adidas, Deckers, Staud, and Diesel. The platform has also served companies like YKK in modeling custom designs for sale for its fasteners. They also partnered with virtual firms Unity and Unreal.
