= One Less Day (Dying Young) =

Single by Rob Thomas

from the album Chip Tooth Smile
- Released: February 20, 2019
- Genre: Pop; pop rock
- Length: 3:04
- Label: Atlantic
- Songwriter: Rob Thomas
- Producer: Butch Walker

Rob Thomas singles chronology
"Heaven Help Me" (2016)	"One Less Day (Dying Young)" (2019)	"Can't Help Me Now" (2019)

"One Less Day (Dying Young)" is a song by American singer Rob Thomas. It is the first single from the album Chip Tooth Smile, released on February 20, 2019.

== Background ==
He told Billboard that when he was in his 20s, he "simultaneously thought that I was going to live forever and I wasn't going to make it past 25".

"One Less Day" was prompted by the realization that, at 47, he "was already too old to die young".

== Music ==
The song is about getting older and is an ode to life. He sees every day he lives as a privilege.

I'm not afraid of getting older

I'm one less day from dying young I see the light go past my shoulder

I'm one less day from dying young

== Charts ==
=== Weekly charts ===
Chart (2019)	Peak position
Canada AC (Billboard)	31
Canada Hot AC (Billboard)	34
US Adult Contemporary (Billboard)	18
US Adult Pop Airplay (Billboard)	12
US Dance Club Songs (Billboard)	3

=== Year-end charts ===
Chart (2019)	Position
Iceland (Tónlistinn)	91
US Adult Contemporary (Billboard)	40
US Adult Top 40 (Billboard)	42
