= Rob Thomas (musician) =

American musician (born 1972)

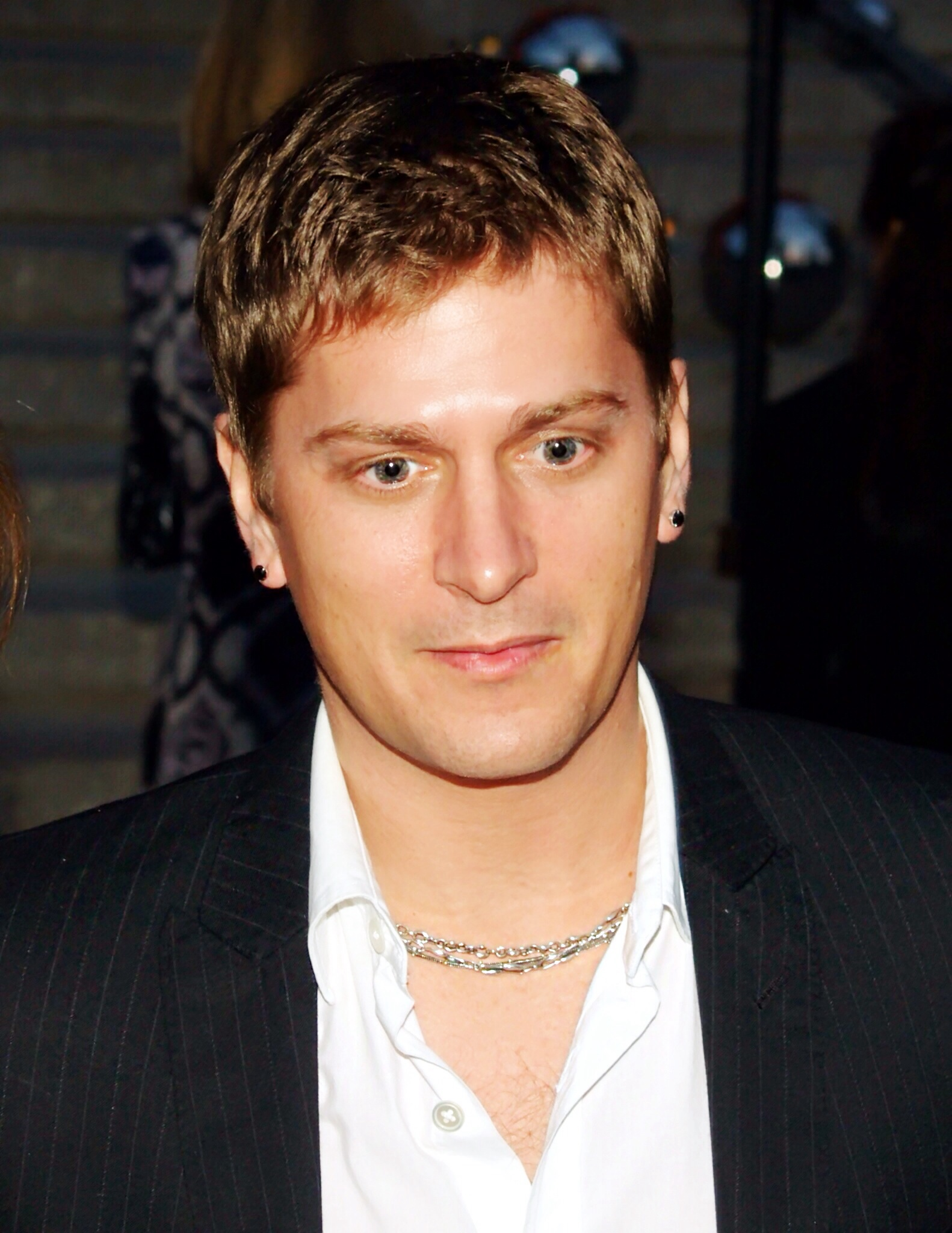
- Thomas at the 2010 Vanity Fair party in New York City

Background information
- Born: Robert Kelly Thomas; February 14, 1972 (age 54); Landstuhl, West Germany
- Origin: Sarasota, Florida, U.S.
- Genres: Pop; pop rock; post-grunge; alternative rock
- Occupations: Singer; songwriter; guitarist; actor
- Instruments: Vocals; keyboards; guitar
- Works: Discography
- Years active: 1989–present
- Labels: Atlantic; Emblem; Universal
- Member of: Matchbox Twenty
- Formerly of: Tabitha's Secret
- Spouse: Marisol Maldonado (m. 1999)
- Website: robthomasmusic.com

Signature
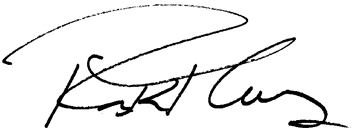

Robert Kelly Thomas (born February 14, 1972) is an American singer, songwriter, and guitarist. He is the lead vocalist for the Florida-based rock band Matchbox Twenty, which he formed in 1995 and with whom he has released five studio albums. As a solo act, he is best known for his guest performance on Santana's 1999 single "Smooth", which won three Grammy Awards, peaked the Billboard Hot 100 for 12 consecutive weeks, and in 2018 was named the second-most successful song in the chart's history. His 2005 single, "Lonely No More," was his first to be released as a lead solo artist. It peaked at number six on the chart and led his debut solo album, ...Something to Be (2005), which peaked atop the Billboard 200.

As part of Matchbox Twenty, Thomas performed and wrote the band's string of commercially successful singles, including "Push", "3AM", "Real World", "Back 2 Good", "Bent", "If You're Gone", "Mad Season", "Disease", "Unwell", "Bright Lights", "How Far We've Come", and "She's So Mean". Thomas has also been a credited songwriter for other artists including Willie Nelson, Mick Jagger, Marc Anthony, Pat Green, Taylor Hicks, Travis Tritt, and Daughtry. In 2004, the Songwriters Hall of Fame gave Thomas its first Hal David Starlight Award, which recognizes young songwriters.

== Early life ==
Thomas was born at Landstuhl Regional Medical Center in Landstuhl, Germany to Bill and Mamie Thomas. Bill Thomas was a United States Army sergeant. Thomas has an elder half-sister, Melissa, from his mother's previous marriage. The Thomas family returned to the United States when Thomas was six months old.

Thomas's parents divorced when he was two years old. Following the divorce, Thomas lived with his mother and sister. They were poor and moved frequently, often staying with Mamie's mother in Lake City, South Carolina. His grandmother was an alcoholic. She owned a small country store and gas station, where she also sold moonshine and marijuana under the counter. He grew up listening to country music and idolized the "big stars who lived ... hard lives", like Johnny Cash and Merle Haggard. Their stories inspired him to be a songwriter.

Thomas and his mother and sister moved to Sarasota, Florida, when he was 10. They settled in the Orlando area the following year. Around this time, Thomas received his first musical instrument: A Casio keyboard. A friend taught him to play, and Thomas practiced by trying to reproduce the songs he heard on the radio. He also acquired a guitar with no strings which he used as a prop while he pretended he was in a rock band.

Thomas's home life was not stable. Thomas describes his mother as an alcoholic who occasionally beat him. When Thomas was 12, his mother was diagnosed with Hodgkin lymphoma and given only six months to live. His sister ran away from home to get married, leaving Thomas to care for their mother on his own. She eventually entered remission. Mamie dated a series of men, some of whom beat her; she loved wild parties. Thomas sometimes woke up to find "10 strangers sleeping off last night's booze-a-thon in the living room".

Thomas attended Lake Brantley High School in the Orlando suburb of Altamonte Springs. He joined the choir in an unsuccessful attempt to attract the attention of a girl that he liked. His choir teacher saw potential in him and told him to keep working. To impress girls at parties, Thomas wrote and played music. A few months before graduation, Thomas dropped out of high school, saying his "regular life was in such disarray that going seemed ridiculous". He later earned a GED.

When he was 17, Thomas was convicted of stealing a Camaro and spent two months in county jail. For the next two or three years, Thomas was homeless. Occasionally, he would stay for a few days or weeks at the homes of various friends. At other times, he would hitchhike around Florida and South Carolina. Soon after getting out of jail, Thomas connected with several musicians. He played in a series of cover bands and began writing songs in earnest. Thomas said that "in songwriting I felt special for the first time. And all I wanted to do was get out of Florida." One of his bands, Fair Warning, earned a three-week job playing at a hotel in Vero Beach. They were fired three days into the job after they were caught stealing beer and candy from the hotel. At one point, Thomas was a member of another band, Tidal Wave, which played mostly surf tunes.

== Career ==
=== 1993–1995: Formation of Matchbox 20 ===
In 1993, Thomas formed the band Tabitha's Secret. Brian Yale was the group's bass player. Paul Doucette earned a spot as drummer after answering an ad. Guitarists Jay Stanley and John Goff rounded out the band. The band was popular in the Orlando area, where they played in bars and nightclubs. Most of their songs were written by Thomas, including "3 A.M." This song, inspired by his time taking care of his mother, was the first that he had ever written and liked. In an effort to recreate that magic, his writing shifted to focus more on emotions inspired from his own life.

Producer Matt Serletic heard them play and was intrigued. The band met him for an introductory meeting, but broke up before any contracts were signed. Thomas worried that he'd never get another chance for a recording contract. Thomas, Yale, and Doucette were still interested in working together, and Serletic introduced them to rhythm guitarist Adam Gaynor and lead guitarist Kyle Cook; together, they formed a new band, Matchbox 20. Serletic sent Thomas to vocal coach Jan Smith to learn to sing better.

The band recorded several demo tapes, with Serletic as their producer. Three radio stations in Orlando and Tampa added the songs to their rotations. Executives at Atlantic Records noticed that the songs were being requested frequently. Although the band sounded very green, executives thought the songs were good. The band was soon signed to Atlantic subsidiary Lava Records.

=== 1996–1998: Yourself or Someone Like You ===
Thomas wrote every song on Matchbox 20's debut album, Yourself or Someone Like You. It was released in October 1996, on the same day that Lava Records folded. The album sold only 600 copies in its first week. The band toured extensively, trying to attract notice. Radio stations were slow to adopt their first single, "Long Day". Thomas and his bandmates were convinced they were soon to be dropped from their contract. Their manager was also worried, and yelled at them to get serious about their performances.

Their fears were well-founded. Officials at Atlantic were close to dropping the band when they noticed that sales had spiked in Birmingham, Alabama. There, radio stations had begun playing another track on the album, "Push". Atlantic released "Push" as a single, and it soon became a Top 5 hit. Its success led the album to be certified gold. Their next single, "3 A.M.", was hugely popular, and the album went multi-platinum. "Real World", and "Back 2 Good" followed.

Nearly seven months after its release, the album reached number 99 on the Billboard 200 chart. It continued to climb, finally reaching as high as number 5. The album was nominated for a Grammy Award and two American Music Awards. In 1997, readers of Rolling Stone named Matchbox 20 the best new band.

Thomas enjoyed his success. When travelling, he'd tell customs officials that his occupation was "rock star", and he often dressed the part, wearing sunglasses and long furry coats. He's described the first few years with Matchbox 20 as a blur, featuring large quantities of alcohol, cocaine, and sexual relationships with women. One of those interludes resulted in a son.

The constant partying took a toll on Thomas and the band. Thomas concedes that their lifestyle began to cause their concerts to suffer. During this period, he gained more than 50 pounds (23 kg). The weight gain earned the band its first mention in Rolling Stone: An item making fun of Thomas. The band members decided together that they wanted to be more professional and began cleaning themselves up. Cocaine use was no longer tolerated. In 1998, Thomas was named one of People magazine's 50 Most Beautiful People.

=== 1999: "Smooth" ===
In 1999, Latin guitarist Carlos Santana began putting together his comeback album, Supernatural, a series of duets. He was looking for one last song to complete the album. Songwriter Itaal Shur had given a demo tape to Santana's representatives. Although they liked the music, they thought the lyrics and melody could be strengthened. One of the executives sent the demo to Thomas, asking him if he'd like to work on it.

Thomas had never worked on a song that he didn't intend to perform, and he was interested in the opportunity to try something new. He wrote the song intending for it to be sung by George Michael.

Thomas wrote the verses to the song that became "Smooth", and he and Shur collaborated on the chorus. He was inspired both by his wife, who is half-Spanish and half-Puerto-Rican, and by Santana himself. When he finished the song, he was unsure whether it was any good. His wife listened to the demo and told him, "This is going to be huge." Santana heard the demo and said he couldn't determine at first whether it was a male or female singing. He had no idea who Thomas was, but he liked the voice and asked that Thomas sing on the record. When they first met, Santana asked Thomas if he was married to a Latin woman.

The song was recorded live, in three takes. Thomas was not aware that it was going to be released as a single until he heard it on the radio. It was a massive hit, spending 58 weeks on the Billboard Hot 100 chart. Billboard later named it the number 2 Hot 100 song of all time. It won three Grammy Awards, for Best Record, Best Song, and Best Pop Collaboration with Vocals. Its success earned him instant credibility as a songwriter. BMI named Thomas its 1999 Pop Songwriter of the Year for "Smooth" and his Matchbox 20 songs. "Smooth" would ultimately become the second biggest-selling single of all time, after Chubby Checker's "The Twist."

"Smooth" increased his visibility, and that of Matchbox 20. The song's video, starring Thomas, was played extensively on VH1 and MTV. That exposure launched him out of anonymity. A new set of listeners, older than the band's initial fan base, was exposed to, and liked, Thomas's work. Yourself or Someone Like You continued to sell briskly. After winning at the Grammy Awards, Atlantic took out ads in many industry publications to make executives aware that Thomas had written not only "Smooth", but also all of the songs on the Matchbox 20 album. Ron Shapiro, an executive at Atlantic, said, "It was our intent to get Rob and this band a substantial amount of credibility."

Thomas says that "Smooth" "really opened up the door for me as a songwriter and a solo artist."

=== 2000–2003: Mad Season and More Than You Think You Are ===
As Matchbox 20 prepared to record their second album, band members had heated discussions over song selection. After flirting with the idea of allowing other band members to provide songs, they chose to record only songs that Thomas had written or co-written. They renamed themselves Matchbox Twenty and, in March 2000, released Mad Season. Its first single, "Bent", reached number 1 on the Billboard Hot 100 chart; it remains the band's only number one hit, despite larger commercial success on previous material. Their tour took them to 87 cities, and they sold out Madison Square Garden in 15 minutes.

Thomas was inducted into the South Carolina Music and Entertainment Hall of Fame in 2001.

When Santana prepared to record his follow-up to Supernatural, he sought to collaborate with Thomas again. Instead of providing vocals, Thomas wrote two songs for the album, which were recorded by Seal and Musiq. Thomas provided songs to other artists as well. Willie Nelson recorded three of Thomas's songs on his 2002 album The Great Divide. One of those, "Recollection Phoenix", had been in contention for the next Matchbox Twenty album before the other band members had decided it wasn't a good fit.

The third Matchbox Twenty album, More Than You Think You Are, wasn't complete until four weeks before its release date, November 19, 2002. For the first time, the band recorded a song not written by Thomas. Two other songs were jointly attributed to Thomas, Cook, and Doucette. As part of the promotion for the album, Thomas and his bandmates were featured on VH1's Behind the Music. When the tour for More Than You Think You Are ended, Thomas, Cook, Doucette, Yale, and Gaynor decided to take a break to focus on their families.

In June 2004, the Songwriters Hall of Fame gave Thomas the inaugural Hal David Starlight Award, which recognizes a young songwriter who has made an outsized impression on the industry.

=== 2004–2007: ...Something to Be and Exile on Mainstream ===
On April 19, 2005, Thomas began his solo career with the release of ...Something to Be which debuted at number 1 on the Billboard 200 album chart. The album included several songs that the other Matchbox Twenty members had rejected, such as "I Am An Illusion". The album was more pop than Thomas's Matchbox Twenty work, adding quirks like sampling and loops. It earned two Grammy nominations, for Best Male Pop Vocal Performance and Best Solo Rock Vocal Performance.

His first single from the album, "Lonely No More", reached number six on the U.S. Billboard Hot 100 chart. The single debuted in the top 10 of the Australian ARIA singles chart on the week of April 4, 2005. The second single, "This Is How a Heart Breaks", went gold in the US and hit the top 50 in Australia. The third single, "Ever the Same", became a top five Adult Contemporary hit.

On October 5, 2005, he started his first solo tour, the Something to Be Tour. In the summer of 2006, Thomas toured with Jewel and Toby Lightman. In September 2006, Thomas's solo effort received more exposure when ABC started using the song "Streetcorner Symphony" in promotional ads for its popular Thursday night lineup. This song was subsequently released as a single.

In January 2007, Thomas released a single entitled "Little Wonders" from the soundtrack to the Disney animated feature, Meet the Robinsons. "Little Wonders" reached No. 5 on the Mediabase Hot Adult Contemporary chart. Thomas was featured on the June 14, 2007, episode of the long-running PBS series Soundstage.

Thomas reunited with his Matchbox Twenty bandmates in 2007. Gaynor had left the band, leaving only four of them. They decided to release a greatest hits album, Exile on Mainstream, which included an additional six new songs. The album released three singles: "How Far We've Come", "All Your Reasons", and "These Hard Times". The album debuted at number 3.

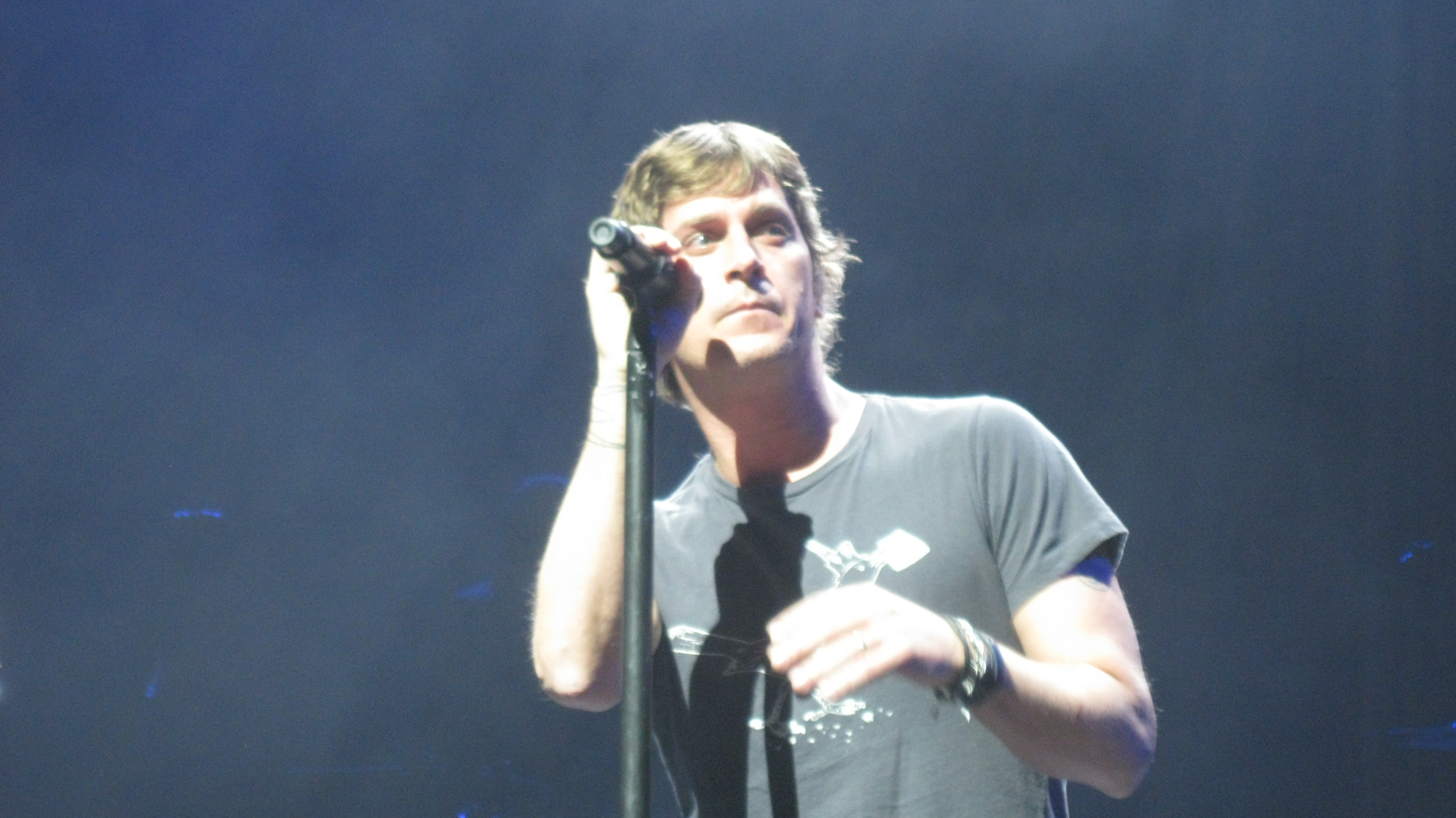
Rob Thomas at a Matchbox Twenty concert in Las Vegas (The Venetian) - IBM Impact 2013-04-30

=== 2009–2011: Cradlesong ===
On September 15, 2008, Thomas told Billboard his second solo album was tentatively called Cradle Songs. Thomas characterized the album as "the usual mish-mosh of styles, but hopefully just holding true to a bunch of good songs." The article also mentioned that the record would nonetheless feature several tracks that "take a more global, rhythmic direction after working with South American and African percussionists." Thomas explained one such experiment:

We started off with the idea of doing a newer version of (Paul Simon's) The Rhythm of the Saints, and that kinda carried us a long way through. It gave us a whole new bed to work with, like 'How do I get my pop sensibility around this and work it into that?' It was a lot of fun. But you go through different phases when you're writing; it took a different turn, and I just followed it, too.

On March 2, 2009, Clark Collis of Entertainment Weekly interviewed Thomas, where he confirmed he had since shelved his initial efforts to evoke The Rhythm of the Saints, and claimed the album was scheduled for a June 30 release. Having played half the forthcoming album to Entertainment Weekly, it was reported that many of the lyrics on Cradlesong were about troubled relationships, and three more song titles were revealed: "Meltdown" (described as "INXS-esque power pop" that stood out as "a possible first single"), "Fire on the Mountain" (an "epic, tribal drum-driven" track inspired by Dave Eggers' book What Is the What) and "Getting Late" (suggested as the "set's likely closer" and what Thomas described as "a little ditty about death.").

On March 11, 2009, Rob Thomas created his own Twitter account and announced via the social application that "Her Diamonds" would be the lead single from Cradlesong.

Thomas has also stated via Twitter that Cradlesong had been mastered and featured fourteen tracks culled from the twenty-four songs recorded during the album sessions. All twenty-four tracks were fully mixed and mastered, leaving plenty of material left over for B-sides, iTunes, or EPs.

On June 9, 2009, Thomas released "Give Me the Meltdown" to the US iTunes Store. Similarly, "Someday" was released on June 16. On June 22, Cradlesong was made available for streaming only on the we7 website, one week ahead of its UK release date.

Thomas promoted the album with his 2009/2010 tour, Cradlesong Tour.

In March 2010, Thomas announced plans to release a four-song digital-only EP entitled the Someday EP. Featuring three new songs, the EP was released to iTunes on March 30, 2010, and all other digital retailers April 6, 2010.

=== 2012–2014: North ===
After his solo success, many of Thomas's confidants urged him to leave Matchbox Twenty. As Thomas wrapped up his tour for Cradlesong, he began writing songs for consideration for the next Matchbox Twenty album. He gathered in Nashville, Tennessee, with his bandmates to narrow down the work he had already done and develop new material. The group members disagreed on which musical direction the new album should take. For three months, they argued and drank, in what Thomas describes as a "$100,000 bender". Finally, producer Serletic appeared and told them to stop drinking and get to work. The lecture worked. The result was a true collaboration. For the first time, the band recorded several songs written solely by Doucette and Yale.

Matchbox Twenty's next album, North, was released on September 4, 2012, ten years after their last full-length album of new material. It debuted at number 1 on the Billboard Top 200 chart.

=== 2015–2024: The Great Unknown, Chip Tooth Smile, Something About Christmas Time, and Where the Light Goes ===
Thomas performed several new album tracks in early 2015: "Hold On Forever", "Great Unknown", and "Heaven Help Me". Thomas released the first single from The Great Unknown, "Trust You", on May 25, 2015. The Great Unknown was released on August 21, 2015. He spent two years touring it prior. "Hold on Forever" was announced as the album's second single on September 28. The tour for Thomas' album included holographic representations of Thomas produced with vntana technology so that fans could pose for photos with him during the concert.

Thomas announced on February 15, 2019, that his fourth studio album—titled Chip Tooth Smile—would be released on April 26, 2019. The lead single for the album, "One Less Day (Dying Young)", was released on February 20, 2019.

On October 7, 2021, Thomas announced that his first Christmas studio album titled "Something About Christmas Time" would be released on October 22. He recorded the album, which includes both original and cover songs, in his home studio in New York during the summer.

Matchbox Twenty got back together for Where the Light Goes album in May 2023, which they went on tour to promote in 2024.

=== 2025–present: All Night Days and label change ===
On May 6, 2025, Thomas announced that his sixth solo studio album will be titled All Night Days and that he would embark on a 25-date U.S. tour, The All Night Days Tour, from August 1 to September 6, 2025. On May 25, 2025, he announced 11 tour dates in Australia and New Zealand from October 24 to November 15, 2025. The tour is to feature special guests A Great Big World and The Lucky.

On July 11, 2025, Thomas released the album's first single, titled "Hard to Be Happy", another song from the album, "Thrill Me", plus information about the album on streaming services: the tracklist, a release date of September 5, 2025, and a change in labels from Atlantic Records to Universal Music Group. Thomas released "Picture Perfect", the album's next single, on August 8, 2025.

== Artistry ==
=== Music and voice ===
During solo tours, Thomas plays some Matchbox Twenty songs, but arranged differently—often for acoustic instruments.

As a solo artist, Thomas is known for "emotive radio hits". His solo albums have a much stronger pop feel. His album The Great Unknown was "unabashed pop". Monique La Terra of the Music called him a "defining voice of post-grunge pop rock." Stephen Thomas Erlewine of AllMusic wrote "As the lead singer for Matchbox Twenty, Thomas was at the forefront of the polished mainstream alt-rock that emerged in the late '90s."

His detractors say the music is fluff and too sweet.

=== Songwriting ===
Thomas writes all of the time, saying "it's a lot easier to come up with ideas than it is to edit them."

Thomas admits that his songs have "a radio sensibility". He writes songs that he hopes people will like and does not strive to follow or set trends. In his opinion, this is the reason that he has maintained his career; the music never sounds dated. Each of his songs can stand alone without special effects; Thomas wants his listeners to feel the message of a song even if he is just playing it by himself on an acoustic guitar.

Initially, Thomas tried to write epic love songs, in the vein of Lionel Richie. He did not like most of those attempts. After he finished "3 A.M.", which was inspired by his mother's battle with cancer, Thomas realized that he ought to focus on events in his own life. Many of his later songs are inspired by his wife and her battle with an autoimmune disease.

Lisa Rockman, music reviewer for the Sydney Morning Herald, wrote, "There is a reason millions of fans across the world relate to lyrics penned by Rob Thomas. His words come from the heart."

Thomas chooses his words carefully, "trying to make my phrases more colourful when I'm writing, trying to find the longest way to get to the point that I'm trying to make as opposed to the quickest way."

As his career has progressed, Thomas has more frequently collaborated with other songwriters in order to "keep things fresh and not feel like I'm going back to the same well and just writing the same songs over and over and over". In 2021 he admitted his songs come to him the same way, and his confidence as a writer comes and goes and he does not want to rip himself off. He describes himself as an "emotional dude".

== Personal life ==
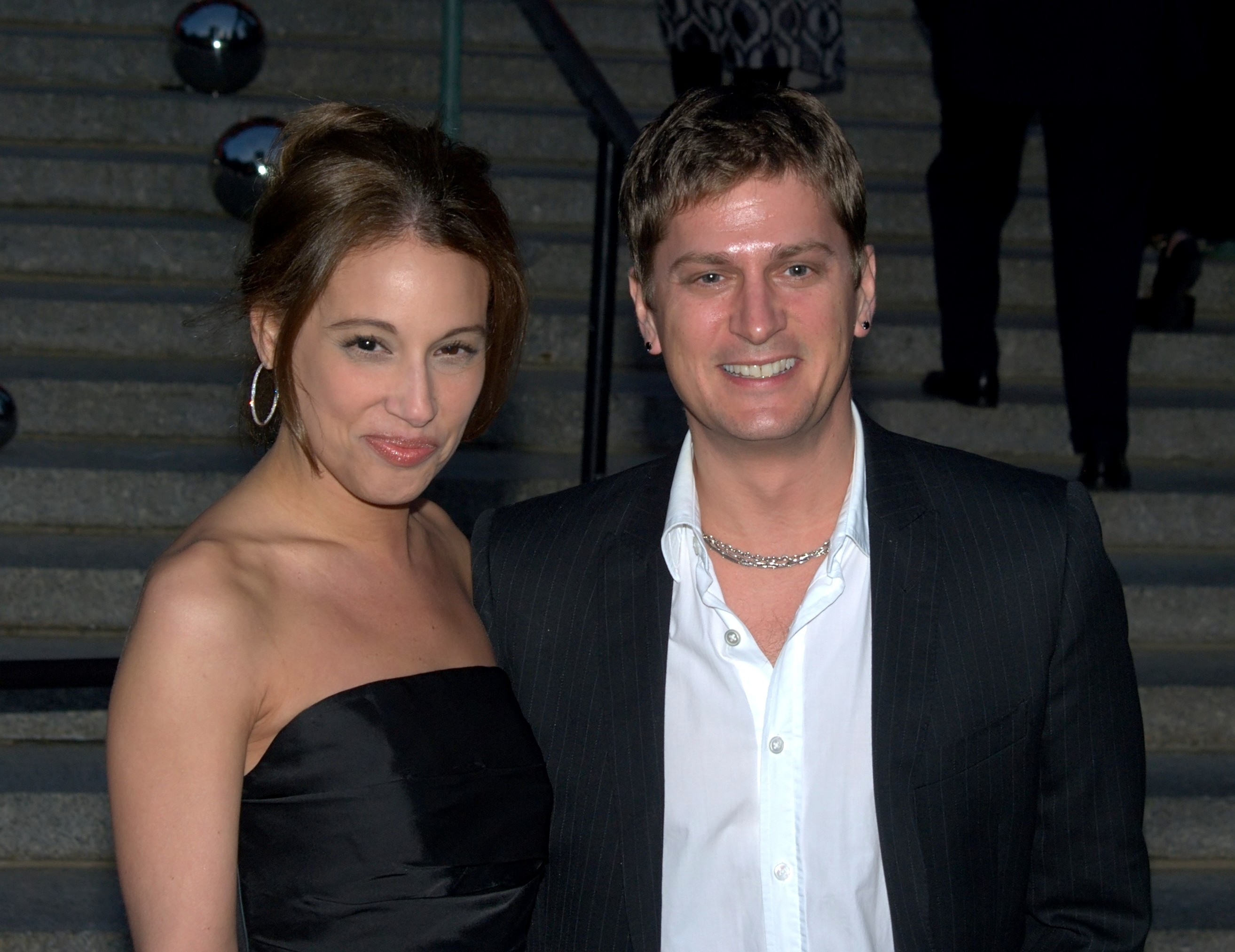
Thomas and his wife Marisol at the 2010 Tribeca Film Festival

A mutual friend introduced him to model Marisol Maldonado at an afterparty in Montreal in late 1997. They both claim it was love at first sight. Thomas said that, "I knew the second I kissed her that I would never, ever kiss another person." As he was in the midst of an international tour, their initial courtship was via phone. Maldonado was at first reluctant to date Thomas, unsure if she could handle being the wife of a rock star. When he returned to the United States, they went on their first date, to a music festival in Boston. That night, he told her he would marry her, and a month later he proposed. They were married on October 2, 1999, at manager Michael Lippman's ranch in California. Their wedding was broadcast on ABC's Celebrity Weddings in Style. They reside in Bedford, New York.

Thomas has a son, Maison Thomas Eudy, from a previous relationship, born on July 10, 1998. Maison is credited as a songwriter for Thomas's song "I Love It" from his 2019 album Chip Tooth Smile.

=== Charity work ===
The Thomases are committed animal lovers and supporters of animal charities. Thomas and his wife have established the Sidewalk Angels Foundation, a non-profit organization created to help needy people in and around America's big cities by partnering with various charities to assist people who cannot afford medical care, and animals that have been abandoned or abused.

=== Political views ===
Politically, Thomas considers himself a "fairly liberal guy". He is a strong supporter of gay rights and wrote a piece in favor of legalizing same-sex marriage. He closed the article by writing, "Each of us has a short ride on this earth and as long as we stay in our lane, and don't affect someone else's ride, we should be allowed to drive as we see fit."

== Discography ==
- ...Something to Be (2005)
- Cradlesong (2009)
- The Great Unknown (2015)
- Chip Tooth Smile (2019)
- Something About Christmas Time (2021)
- All Night Days (2025)

== Tours ==
Headlining

- Something to Be Tour (2005–06)
- Cradlesong Tour (2009–10)
- A Special Intimate Performance with Rob Thomas (2014)
- The Great Unknown Tour (2015–16)
- Chip Tooth Tour (2019)
- The All Night Days Tour (2025)

Co-headlining

- Counting Crows & Rob Thomas on Tour (with Counting Crows) (2016)

== Awards and nominations ==
=== APRA Music Awards ===
Year	Nominee / work	Award	Result
2006	"Lonely No More"	Most Performed Foreign Work	Nominated

=== ASCAP Pop Music Awards ===
Year	Nominee / work	Award	Result
2006	"Lonely No More"	Most Performed Songs	Won
2007	"Lonely No More"	Most Performed Songs	Won
2007	"Ever the Same"	Most Performed Songs	Won

=== American Music Awards ===
Year	Nominee / work	Award	Result
2005	Rob Thomas	Favorite Pop/Rock Male Artist	Nominated
2006	Rob Thomas	Favorite Adult Contemporary Artist	Nominated

=== BMI Pop Awards ===
Year	Nominee / work	Award	Result
1999	Rob Thomas	Songwriter of the Year	Won
1999	"Push"	Award-Winning Songs	Won
1999	"3AM"	Award-Winning Songs	Won
1999	"Real World"	Award-Winning Songs	Won

=== Billboard Music Awards ===
Year	Nominee / work	Award	Result
2000	"Smooth"	Top Hot 100 Song	Nominated
2000	"Smooth"	Top Hot 100 Airplay Track	Nominated
2000	"Smooth"	Top Adult Top 40 Track	Nominated
2005	Rob Thomas	New Artist of the Year	Nominated
2005	Rob Thomas	Top Adult Top 40 Artist	Nominated
2005	"Lonely No More"	Top Adult Top 40 Song	Nominated
2006	"Ever the Same"	Top Adult Top 40 Song	Nominated
2006	Himself	Top Hot Adult Contemporary Artist	Won
2006	Himself	Top Adult Top 40 Artist	Nominated

=== Billboard Music Video Awards ===
Year	Nominee / work	Award	Result
2000	"Smooth" (with Santana)	FAN.tastic Video	Nominated

=== California Music Awards ===
Year	Nominee / work	Award	Result
2000	"Smooth" (with Santana)	Outstanding Single	Nominated

=== Grammy Awards ===
Year	Nominee / work	Award	Result
2000	"Smooth"	Song of the Year	Won
2000	"Smooth"	Record of the Year	Won
2000	"Smooth"	Best Pop Collaboration with Vocals	Won
2001	"Bent"	Best Rock Song	Nominated
2006	"Lonely No More"	Best Male Pop Vocal Performance	Nominated
2006	"This Is How a Heart Breaks"	Best Solo Rock Vocal Performance	Nominated

=== Teen Choice Awards ===
Year	Nominee / work	Award	Result
2005	Himself	Choice Music: Male Artist	Nominated
2005	Himself	Choice Music: Breakout Artist - Male	Nominated
2005	...Something to Be	Choice Music: Album	Nominated
2005	"Lonely No More"	Choice Music: Single	Nominated

=== XM Nation Music Awards ===
Year	Nominee / work	Award	Result
2005	Rob Thomas	Best Solo Career	Nominated

== Television ==
Thomas appeared on the American sitcom It's Always Sunny in Philadelphia in its fourth season, in which he played himself as a deranged patient of a rehabilitation center. He also served as an advisor for Cee-Lo Green's team during the third season of the NBC reality competition series The Voice.

Thomas has noted that he is sometimes mistaken for television writer Rob Thomas, and vice versa. A conversation between the two men on this subject led to Thomas agreeing to perform a musical number as himself in the season two finale of the TV show iZombie, penned by his namesake. He and his wife were devoted fans of the show. Thomas was killed in the episode.

He performed on NBC's Rockefeller Center Tree Lighting Concert on November 29, 2023. His 2021 song, A New York Christmas, was chosen because it centers on compassion, understanding and peace.

== See also ==
- Matchbox Twenty
- List of number-one hits (United States)
- List of artists who reached number one on the Hot 100 (U.S.)
- List of number-one dance hits (United States)
- List of artists who reached number one on the U.S. Dance chart
