= Her Diamonds =

2009 single by Rob Thomas

Single by Rob Thomas

from the album Cradlesong
- B-side: "Overrun"
- Released: April 27, 2009
- Genre: Pop rock
- Length: 4:40 (album version); 3:48 (radio edit); 3:52 (video edit)
- Label: Emblem; Atlantic
- Songwriter: Rob Thomas
- Producer: Matt Serletic

Rob Thomas singles chronology
"Little Wonders" (2007)	"Her Diamonds" (2009)	"Give Me the Meltdown" (2009)

Music video
- "Her Diamonds" on YouTube

"Her Diamonds" is the lead single from Rob Thomas's second studio album, Cradlesong (2009). Thomas confirmed the single's release via a Twitter account he had created on March 11, 2009. The single premiered on April 22, preceding the release of Cradlesong on June 30. On July 3, 2009, Thomas confirmed in an interview with Natalie Morales and Lester Holt on NBC's Today show that the song references his wife Marisol's auto-immune disease. Thomas announced his wife sang backup on the track and also helped produce its arrangement.

== Chart performance ==
On the Billboard Hot 100 the song reached number 23, his highest peak since 2005's hit "Lonely No More". On the Hot Adult Top 40 Tracks radio airplay chart, "Her Diamonds" debuted at number 27. The track would go on to top the Billboard Hot Adult Top 40 Tracks chart the week of August 8, becoming Thomas' third number one to date and extending Thomas' streak of top-five singles as a solo artist on the format to six (seven if including "Smooth", his collaboration with Santana).

During its first week of release, it was the most added song to radio in Australia. While on the ARIA Singles Chart the song debuted at number eight and later rose to number three. The song performed well on the Canadian Hot 100. It moved from number 64 to number 42 and then to a peak of number 27. The song also became a massive radio hit, peaking at number 1 on the Australian airplay chart and staying at the top spot for 5 weeks.

== Music video ==
The music video for the song was directed by Dave Meyers and the video as well as behind the scenes can be seen on Rob Thomas's official website.

The video premiered on May 12, 2009 on VH1.com. The video features American actress Alicia Silverstone. The video starts with scenes of a blue, icy, background. In this background (which is actually ice) reflections of Thomas singing are shown. Later, the video shows Silverstone completely trapped in ice and motionless sitting on a bed in a room. The sun shining through the window melts the ice until Silverstone is shown shivering. She falls to the floor, still shivering. Later, more scenes of Thomas singing are shown, and the video ends with Silverstone gazing out the window at the rising sun. The video reached number one on both Billboard's hot videoclips chart and VH1's top 20 countdown.

Visual effects for the video were created by Baked FX.

== Track listing ==
Best Buy exclusive CD single edition
No.	Title	Length
1.	"Her Diamonds"	4:40
2.	"Overrun"	4:12

Australian CD single
No.	Title	Length
1.	"Her Diamonds"	4:40
2.	"Overrun"	4:11

== Charts ==
=== Weekly charts ===
Chart (2009)	Peak position
Australia (ARIA)	3
Australian Airplay (ARIA)	1
Canada Hot 100 (Billboard)	28
Canada AC (Billboard)	3
Canada Hot AC (Billboard)	5
Germany (GfK)	79
Hungary (Rádiós Top 40)	11
New Zealand (Recorded Music NZ)	35
US Billboard Hot 100	23
US Adult Alternative Airplay (Billboard)	15
US Adult Contemporary (Billboard)	2
US Adult Pop Airplay (Billboard)	1
US Pop Airplay (Billboard)	24

=== Year-end charts ===
Chart (2009)	Position
Australia (ARIA)	49
Canada (Canadian Hot 100)	98
Hungary (Rádiós Top 40)	80
US Billboard Hot 100	85
US Adult Contemporary (Bioard)	12
US Adult Top 40 (Billboard)	7

Chart (2010)	Position
US Adult Contemporary (Billboard)	15

== Sales and certifications ==
Region	Certification	Certified units/sales
Australia (ARIA)	Platinum	70,000^{^}
United States (RIAA)	Platinum	1,000,000^{‡}
^{^} Shipments figures based on certification alone.^{‡} Sales+streaming figures based on certification alone.
