= Mockingbird (Rob Thomas song) =

Single by Rob Thomas

from the album Cradlesong
- Released: April 20, 2010
- Length: 4:00 (Album Version); 3:51 (Radio Edit)
- Label: Emblem / Atlantic
- Songwriter: Rob Thomas
- Producer: Matt Serletic

Rob Thomas singles chronology
| "Someday" (2009) | "Mockingbird" (2010) | "Real World '09" (2010) |

Mockingbird is a song by American recording artist Rob Thomas. It is the fourth single (third outside of Australia) from the album Cradlesong, released on April 20, 2010. The song debuted at #50 on the ARIA Charts and, in the US, debuted at 29 on the Adult Pop Songs chart and at 100 on the Billboard Hot 100, making his third song of Cradlesong to reach the Hot 100. For the chart week ending August 28, 2010, the song reached #95 on the Hot 100.

"Mockingbird" marks Thomas's ninth solo top 10 and eighth consecutive top 5 hit on the Adult Pop Songs chart, peaking at number four. Thomas's combined 21 trips to the chart's top 10 (counting the singles as lead singer of Matchbox Twenty) gives him the second best top 10 sum in the chart's history after only Goo Goo Dolls' 13.

== Charts ==
=== Weekly charts ===
Weekly chart performance for "Mockingbird"
| Chart (2010–2011) | Peak position |
|---|---|
| Australia (ARIA) | 50 |
| Canada Hot 100 (Billboard) | 73 |
| Canada AC (Billboard) | 21 |
| Canada Hot AC (Billboard) | 13 |
| US Billboard Hot 100 | 95 |
| US Adult Contemporary (Billboard) | 27 |
| US Adult Pop Airplay (Billboard) | 4 |

=== Year-end charts ===
Year-end chart performance for "Mockingbird"
| Chart (2010) | Position |
|---|---|
| US Adult Top 40 (Billboard) | 16 |
