= The Great Unknown (Rob Thomas album) =

Studio album by Rob Thomas
- Released: August 21, 2015
- Recorded: Late 2013 – Mid-2015
- Genres: Pop rock; alternative rock
- Length: 43:17
- Label: Atlantic
- Producers: Matt Serletic (also exec.); Ricky Reed; Ryan Tedder; Noel Zancanella; Shep Goodman; Aaron Accetta

Rob Thomas chronology
Cradlesong (2009)	The Great Unknown (2015)	Chip Tooth Smile (2019)

Singles from The Great Unknown
- 1. "Trust You" Released: May 29, 2015; 2. "Hold On Forever" Released: September 25, 2015; 3. "Pieces" Released: June 17, 2016; 4. "Heaven Help Me" Released: December 27, 2016

The Great Unknown is the third solo studio album by the Matchbox Twenty lead singer Rob Thomas, released on August 21, 2015, through Atlantic Records. Its lead single, "Trust You", premiered on Entertainment Weekly's website on May 29, 2015.

== Critical reception ==
Professional ratings
Aggregate scores
Source	Rating
Metacritic	69/100
Review scores
Source	Rating
AllMusic	4/5 stars
The Boston Globe	(positive)
Rolling Stone	3/5 stars
New York Daily News	2/5 stars

The Great Unknown received generally positive reviews from music critics. At Metacritic, which assigns a normalized rating out of 100 to reviews from mainstream critics, the album received an average score of 69, based on 4 reviews, which indicates "generally favorable reviews". In a positive review, Stephen Thomas Erlewine of AllMusic described the record as, "an album that deliberately side-steps many of Thomas' signature moves while still sounding unmistakably like him." The Boston Globe's Sarah Rodman wrote that on The Great Unknown, the singer continues his career of composing, "catchy melodies, lyrics straightforward in their universality, and crisp production". According to her, "Thomas is either becoming a stronger, more nuanced singer or continuing to learn how to write in a way that more effectively displays the various facets of his voice."

In a more mixed review, Chuck Arnold of Rolling Stone wrote, "Rob Thomas remains a known quantity on his third solo album. While that means there aren't many surprises, the good news is he's still the same consummate pop-rock craftsman who has been making it all sound so smooth for years." Jim Farber of New York Daily News was more critical towards the album's composition and lyrics: "The songs offer few individualized lyrical details, and no consistent themes, to pin on a particular person. The arrangements, likewise, have a slick adaptability that makes these songs serviceable cover material for any pop star of the hour."

== Track listing ==
All tracks are written by Rob Thomas, except where noted.

No.	Title	Writer(s)	Producer(s)	Length
1.	"I Think We'd Feel Good Together"	Rob Thomas; Henry Walter; Adrien Gough	Matt Serletic; Ricky Reed	3:00
2.	"Trust You"	Thomas; Ryan Tedder; Noel Zancanella	Tedder; Zancanella; Serletic (vocals)	3:08
3.	"Hold On Forever"		Serletic	3:35
4.	"Wind It Up"		Serletic	3:09
5.	"One Shot"	Thomas; Shep Goodman; Aaron Accetta	Goodman; Accetta	2:50
6.	"The Great Unknown"		Serletic	3:38
7.	"Absence of Affection"	Thomas; Reed	Serletic	3:36
8.	"Things You Said"		Serletic	3:04
9.	"Paper Dolls"		Serletic	3:04
10.	"NLYTM"		Serletic	2:47
11.	"Heaven Help Me"		Serletic	3:21
12.	"Lie to Me"	Thomas; Frank Romano	Serletic	3:45
13.	"Pieces"	Thomas; Serletic	Serletic	4:20
Total length:				43:17

Target bonus tracks
No.	Title	Producer(s)	Length
14.	"All the Best Things"	Serletic	3:38
15.	"Steady"	Serletic	3:34
Total length:			50:29

Notes

- "NLYTM" is an acronym for "Not Like You Told Me".

== Personnel ==
Musicians

- Aidean Abounasseri – guitar (6)
- Aaron Accetta – background vocals, guitar, acoustic guitar, bass guitar, keyboard programming, and drum programming (5)
- Alex Arias – programming (1, 6–8, 11), synthesizer (8), beat box (4)
- Yonatan "xSDTRK" Ayal – programming (1, 3, 4, 6–12)
- Glenn Berger – tenor saxophone (7)
- Ruth Ann-Cunningham – lead vocals (9), background vocals (1, 4, 7–9, 12)
- Ryan Dragon – trombone (7)
- Christian Dugas – background vocals (1, 4)
- Sarah Dugas – background vocals (1, 4)
- Laurence Fishburne – vocals (8)
- Shep Goodman – background vocals, guitar, acoustic guitar, bass guitar, keyboard programming, and drum programming (5)
- La Tanya Hall – background vocals (7, 10, 11)
- James Hovorka – trumpet (7)
- Victor Indrizzo – drums and percussion (1, 4, 6, 7, 9, 12)
- J. Ryan Kern – orchestration (7)
- Bunny Knutson – dude choir (1, 4, 7)
- Jason Lader – bass guitar (1, 3, 4, 6–12), synthesizer (4, 6, 8, 10, 12), modular (6, 8–10, 12), keyboards (6, 9–11), piano (1, 4), guitar (1, 7), acoustic guitar (8), strings (3), programming (8)
- Adam MacDougal – keyboards (8)
- Ray Parker Jr. – guitar (1)
- Brent Paschke – guitar (1, 3, 4, 7–12), bass guitar (8), synthesizer (8), programming (8)
- Tim Pierce – guitar (3)
- Ricky Reed – programming (1)
- Elijah Samuels – saxophone (2)
- Matt Serletic – piano (1, 3, 4, 9, 13), synthesizer (1, 4, 7–9), programming (1, 7, 12), Fender Rhodes (3, 4), keyboards (11, 12), organ (3), percussion (3), bells (3), vocals (4), bass guitar (7), dude choir (1, 4, 7), strings (13), horn arrangements (7), string arrangements (13)
- Ryan Tedder – background vocals, guitar, keyboards, programming, and drums (2)
- Rob Thomas – lead vocals, background vocals (3, 5–8, 10–13), piano (8), programming (6), shaker (6)
- Lee Thornburg – trumpet (7)
- Patrick Woodward – dude choir (1, 4, 7)
- Lyle Workman – guitar (1, 4, 7–9, 12)
- Noel Zancanella – bass guitar, keyboards, programming, and drums (2)

Technical personnel

- Alex Anders – digital editing
- Alex Arias – engineer, digital editing
- James Brown – engineer
- Joe Costable – engineer
- Ryan Enockson – assistant engineer
- Rich Fabrizio – assistant engineer
- Chris Gehringer – mastering
- Serban Ghenea – mixing (1–3, 5, 7, 8, 10–12)
- John Goodmanson – engineer
- John Hanes – engineer
- Ryan Hewitt – engineer
- Adam Korbesmeyer – assistant engineer
- Kelle Musgrave – production coordinator
- Sean Oakley – engineer
- Kristen Reynolds – production coordinator
- Rich Rich – engineer
- Dave Schiffman – engineer
- Jason Staniulis – assistant engineer
- Morgan Stratton – assistant engineer
- Matthew Tryba – assistant engineer
- Roman Urazov – digital editing
- Mike Wuerth – assistant engineer
- Joe Zook – mixing (4, 6, 9, 13)

== Charts ==
Chart (2015)	Peak position
Australian Albums (ARIA)	4
Canadian Albums (Billboard)	13
Hungarian Albums (MAHASZ)	13
New Zealand Albums (RMNZ)	31
UK Albums (Official Charts)	95
US Billboard 200	6
