= Chip Tooth Smile =

Studio album by Rob Thomas
- Released: April 26, 2019
- Genre: Pop rock
- Length: 39:34
- Label: Atlantic
- Producer: Butch Walker; Benny Blanco

Rob Thomas chronology
| The Great Unknown (2015) | Chip Tooth Smile (2019) | Something About Christmas Time (2021) |

Singles from Chip Tooth Smile
- 1. "One Less Day (Dying Young)" Released: February 20, 2019; 2. "Can't Help Me Now" Released: July 2019

Professional ratings
Review scores
| Source | Rating |
|---|---|
| AllMusic | 4/5 stars |

Chip Tooth Smile is the fourth studio album by American singer Rob Thomas, released on April 26, 2019, through Atlantic Records. It is his first album in four years, following 2015's The Great Unknown, and was preceded by the single "One Less Day (Dying Young)", which reached the top 20 at adult contemporary radio in the United States. Thomas embarked on tour in North America in support of the album in May 2019.

== Background ==
The album title comes from a chipped tooth Thomas got when he was a teenager slamdancing. After his success with Matchbox Twenty, Thomas could finally afford dental work, although his wife stated that he wasn't allowed to get his chip tooth fixed, believing his "chip tooth smile" gave him personality.

The album is produced by Butch Walker. Thomas began telling people that Walker was producing the album before he had talked to Walker about it, eventually telling him that "he had to do the record because I already told everyone that he's doing it". Thomas has described the record as "mostly me and Butch" as there were only two other musicians that played on the album.

The music was shaped by Thomas' 1980s influences as well as "the pop-rock songs for which he's become so well-known." Thomas stated that while making the album, he was doing so primarily for his fans and not to necessarily draw in those who had not previously heard his music.

== Promotion ==
Thomas called lead single "One Less Day (Dying Young)" an "anthem about life and living". It was considered similar in sound to Bruce Springsteen, as was the album cover. A music video was also released for the track, directed by Andy Morahan, that shows Thomas performing the song surrounded by candles and accompanied by a fire dancer.

== Track listing ==
All tracks are written by Rob Thomas, except where noted. All tracks are produced by Butch Walker, except "We Were Beautiful", produced by Benny Blanco.

| No. | Title | Writer(s) | Length |
|---|---|---|---|
| 1. | "One Less Day (Dying Young)" | | 3:04 |
| 2. | "Timeless" | Thomas; Walker | 3:56 |
| 3. | "Can't Help Me Now" | | 3:23 |
| 4. | "Funny" | | 3:07 |
| 5. | "I Love It" | Thomas; Maison Thomas Eudy; Walker | 3:22 |
| 6. | "The Man to Hold the Water" | | 2:40 |
| 7. | "We Were Beautiful" | Thomas; Blanco | 2:55 |
| 8. | "It's Only Love" | Thomas; Matt Beck | 3:29 |
| 9. | "Early in the Morning" | | 4:21 |
| 10. | "The Worst in Me" | | 3:13 |
| 11. | "Tomorrow" | | 3:00 |
| 12. | "Breathe Out" | | 3:04 |
| Total length: | | | 39:34 |

== Personnel ==
- Jonathan Allen – strings engineer (6, 8)
- Simon Baggs – violin (6, 8)
- Matt Beck – guitar (7), piano (7, 8)
- Benny Blanco – instrumentation, programming, and keyboards (7)
- Natalia Bonner – violin (6, 8)
- Lori Casteel – strings copyist (6, 8)
- Mike Casteel – strings copyist (6, 8)
- Richard Cookson – viola (6, 8)
- Caroline Dearnley – cello (6, 8)
- Zvi "Angry Beard Man" Edelman – production coordinator (7)
- Mark Endert – mixing (1–6, 8–12)
- Jonathan Evans-Jones – violin (6, 8)
- Serban Ghenea – mixing (7)
- John Hanes – engineer for mix (7)
- Peter Hanson – violin (6, 8)
- Jackie Hartley – violin (6, 8)
- Doug Johnson – assistant mixing engineer (1–6, 8–12)
- Magnus Johnston – violin (6, 8)
- Zach Kornhauser – additional engineering assistant and gang vocals (1, 10)
- Joe LaPorta – mastering
- Julian Leaper – violin (6, 8)
- Andrew "Schwifty" Luftman – production coordinator (7)
- Roger Joseph Manning Jr. – keyboards (1, 2, 8, 10)
- Rob Mathes – string arrangement and conducting (6, 8)
- Jenny Nendick – strings contractor (6, 8)
- Joseph Pomarico – additional engineering and gang vocals (1, 10)
- Lacy Rostyak – violin (1)
- Dave "Spanks" Schwerkolt – engineer (7)
- Jacqueline Shave – violin and concertmaster (6, 8)
- Sarah "Goodie Bag" Shelton – production coordinator (7)
- Suzy Shinn – additional editing (1–6, 8–12)
- Ebonie Smith – additional engineering and gang vocals (1)
- Mark Stepro – drums (1, 4, 8, 10, 11)
- Todd Stopera – assistant engineer (1–6, 8–12)
- Astrid "Aaaaastriiiiid" Taylor – production coordinator (7)
- Rob Thomas – vocals, guitar (7)
- Butch Walker – engineer, drums, bass, guitars, keyboards, programming, backing vocals, and percussion (1–6, 8–12)
- Bruce White – viola (6, 8)
- Paul Willey – violin (6, 8)
- Tony Woollard – cello (6, 8)
- Soffia "Sofabon" Yen – production coordinator (7)

== Charts ==
| Chart (2019) | Peak position |
|---|---|
| Australian Albums (ARIA) | 3 |
| Canadian Albums (Billboard) | 36 |
| Scottish Albums (OCC) | 26 |
| UK Album Downloads (OCC) | 18 |
| UK Physical Albums (OCC) | 51 |
| US Billboard 200 | 13 |
