= Someday (Rob Thomas song) =

Single by Rob Thomas

from the album Cradlesong
- Released: September 2009 (digital); December 1, 2009 (radio)
- Recorded: 2009
- Genre: Pop rock, alternative rock
- Length: 4:07 (album version); 3:40 (radio edit)
- Label: Atlantic / Warner Music Group
- Songwriters: Rob Thomas; Shy Carter; Matt Serletic
- Producer: Matt Serletic

Rob Thomas singles chronology
"Give Me the Meltdown" (2009)	"Someday" (2009)	"Mockingbird" (2010)

"Someday" is a song released from Rob Thomas' second album, Cradlesong. It was released as the album's third single (second outside of Australia) in September 2009 only in digital format, and followed as a physical release in December 2009.

It debuted at No. 93 on the Billboard Hot 100, peaking at No. 59. It has since become Thomas's third career No. 1 on Billboard's Adult Top 40 chart as a solo artist, and fourth overall, also extending his top-five singles streak on the format to seven (eight when including his collaborative hit "Smooth").

== Music video ==
The music video was released on 15 September 2009 and is directed by Alan Ferguson. It captures Rob Thomas wandering through a parade in downtown New York City.

== Chart positions ==
=== Weekly charts ===
Chart (2009–10)	Peak position
Canada AC (Billboard)	23
Canada Hot AC (Billboard)	22
Hungary (Rádiós Top 40)	30
US Billboard Hot 100	59
US Pop Airplay (Billboard)	30
US Adult Alternative Airplay (Billboard)	26
US Adult Pop Airplay (Billboard)	1
US Adult Contemporary (Billboard)	4

=== Year-end charts ===
Chart (2010)	Position
US Adult Contemporary (Billboard)	7
US Adult Top 40 (Billboard)	18

=== Sales and Certifications ===
Region	Certification	Certified units/sales
United States (RIAA)	Gold	500,000^{‡}
^{‡} Sales+streaming figures based on certification alone.
