= Give Me the Meltdown =

Single by Rob Thomas

from the album Cradlesong
- Released: June 9, 2009
- Recorded: 2009
- Genre: Pop rock, alternative rock
- Length: 3:13
- Label: Atlantic / Warner Music Group
- Songwriter(s): Rob Thomas, Matt Serletic
- Producer(s): Matt Serletic

Rob Thomas singles chronology
"Her Diamonds" (2009)	"Give Me the Meltdown" (2009)	"Someday" (2009)

"Give Me the Meltdown" is a song released from Rob Thomas' second album, Cradlesong.

It was released to the iTunes Store on June 9, 2009. The song was released as the second single, though exclusively to the Australian market where it peaked at #41. In the United States it peaked at #6 on the Billboard Bubbling Under Hot 100 Singles with digital sales only.

== Music video ==
A music video to "Give Me the Meltdown" was directed by the directing team Walter Robot and premiered on MySpace on July 8, 2009. It featured people melting down and wrecking everything in their office/home/etc, then being stopped by wizards, gorillas, spaceships and other out of place things. Thomas makes a cameo in the video.

== Chart positions ==
Chart (2009)	Peak position
Australia (ARIA)	41
Canada (Canadian Hot 100)	89
US Billboard Bubbling Under Hot 100 Singles	6

== Track listing ==
iTunes single
No.	Title	Length
1.	"Give Me the Meltdown"	3:13
