= Little Wonders =

2007 single by Rob Thomas

Single by Rob Thomas

from the album Meet the Robinsons soundtrack
- B-side: "There's a Great Big Beautiful Tomorrow"; "From the Past to the Future"
- Released: March 13, 2007
- Length: 3:45
- Label: Atlantic, Walt Disney
- Songwriter: Rob Thomas
- Producer: Matt Serletic

Rob Thomas singles chronology
"Streetcorner Symphony" (2005)	"Little Wonders" (2007)	"Her Diamonds" (2009)

"Little Wonders" is a song by American singer-songwriter Rob Thomas, recorded for Disney's animated feature Meet the Robinsons in 2007. It is the second single from the Meet the Robinsons soundtrack. It is featured on the film's soundtrack and in the ending of the film itself, and has been released as a single. "Little Wonders" debuted on the US Billboard Hot 100 at number 78 and subsequently peaked at number 58. The song also became a top-20 hit in Australia, Austria, and Germany.

== Background ==
Rob Thomas revealed on April 1, 2017, via his Facebook page, that the song 'Little Wonders' was written about his and his wife Marisol's first dog Tyler.

== Music video ==
Two different versions of this video have been released, both of which contain various live action references to scenes in Meet the Robinsons.

=== Synopsis ===
The original version features Thomas set against various backdrops, most of which feature crowded scenes. It starts out with Thomas in a rainy day in a city, singing the song under an umbrella (a reference to the film's rainy opening). The camera pans out at the chorus to show various people in the city. The next verse begins with Thomas on a rooftop in the city (a reference to the building rooftop which the film's protagonist, Lewis, spent much time on and various important events of the film take place on), playing an acoustic guitar while singing, and at the second chorus, the camera again pans out to show window views of various people engaging in different activities. The bridge shows Thomas at a kids' softball game (a reference to Goob, Lewis's roommate at the orphanage who revolves around baseball and is a little league baseball player). A kid hits a home run ball, which carries onto a beach, and in front of a house on the coast of the beach, Thomas sings the last of the song while people play around on the beach.

It ends with Thomas walking off the beach into the sunset.

The second version is essentially the same, but with additional footage from Meet the Robinsons spliced in. Both versions were directed by Dave Meyers.

== Track listing ==
1. "Little Wonders" (radio edit) – 3:45
2. "There's a Great Big Beautiful Tomorrow" – 1:59 (performed by They Might Be Giants)
3. "From the Past to the Future" – 2:38 (performed by Danny Elfman)

== Reception ==
“Little Wonders” received positive reviews from critics, who praised its emotional sincerity and Rob Thomas’s vocal performance. Billboard described the track as “a warm, reflective ballad that fits naturally within Thomas’s solo catalog,” noting its strong connection to the themes of Meet the Robinsons. Film music critic Jonathan Broxton, also highlighted the song as “one of the soundtrack’s most effective pop contributions,” calling it “surprisingly heartfelt and thematically strong.” In later years, the song developed a lasting fan following. Rolling Stone Australia reported that Thomas continues to receive frequent requests for “Little Wonders” on tour, noting the track’s “unexpected staying power” and emotional resonance with audiences. Retrospective reviews have since described it as one of the defining Disney pop songs of the 2000s.

== Charts ==
=== Weekly charts ===
Chart (2007)	Peak position
Australia (ARIA)	20
Austria (Ö3 Austria Top 40)	13
Canada Hot 100 (Billboard)	22
Canada AC (Billboard)	15
Canada Hot AC (Billboard)	2
Germany (GfK)	20
Switzerland (Schweizer Hitparade)	40
US Billboard Hot 100	58
US Adult Contemporary (Billboard)	11
US Adult Pop Airplay (Billboard)	5

=== Year-end charts ===
Chart (2007)	Rank
Australia (ARIA)	59
Austria (Ö3 Austria Top 40)	56
Germany (Official German Charts)	54
US Adult Contemporary (Billboard)	22
US Adult Top 40 (Billboard)	15

== Sales and certifications ==
Region	Certification	Certified units/sales
New Zealand (RMNZ)	Platinum	30,000^{‡}
United States (RIAA)	Platinum	1,000,000^{‡}
^{‡} Sales+streaming figures based on certification alone.
