= Lonely No More =

2005 single by Rob Thomas

Single by Rob Thomas

from the album ...Something to Be
- B-side: "Fallen"
- Released: February 14, 2005
- Studio: The Hit Factory (New York City); BiCoastal Music (Ossining, New York); Conway, Henson (Los Angeles)
- Length: 3:47
- Label: Atlantic; Melisma
- Songwriter: Rob Thomas
- Producer: Matt Serletic

Rob Thomas singles chronology
"A New York Christmas" (2003)	"Lonely No More" (2005)	"This Is How a Heart Breaks" (2005)

Music video
- "Lonely No More" on YouTube

"Lonely No More" is the first single from Matchbox Twenty frontman Rob Thomas' debut studio album, ...Something to Be (2005). It was released on February 14, 2005, and became his biggest solo hit, peaking at number one in Hungary, number three in Australia, and number six in the United States. The song was nominated for Best Male Pop Vocal Performance at the 2006 Grammys. In March 2014, British group Rixton interpolated portions of the song for their single "Me and My Broken Heart".

== Music video ==
The official music video for "Lonely No More" was directed by Joseph Kahn. Thomas can be seen in various scenes as they shift or fold violently into each other (while Thomas remains immobile) from being his bedroom, to a nightclub, and to an office. Although the shifting scenes and objects seem to move by themselves, at one point Thomas can be seen physically prodding them to move.

== Awards and nominations ==
=== APRA Awards ===
The APRA Awards are presented annually from 1982 by the Australasian Performing Right Association (APRA).

Year	Nominee / work	Award	Result
2006	"Lonely No More" (Rob Thomas) – Rob Thomas	Most Performed Foreign Work	Won

== Track listings ==
Australian and European maxi-CD single

1. "Lonely No More" – 3:47
2. "Lonely No More" (acoustic) – 4:03
3. "Fallen" – 4:36

UK CD single

1. "Lonely No More" (album version)
2. "Lonely No More" (acoustic)

UK DVD single

1. "Lonely No More" (album version audio) – 3:46
2. "Lonely No More" (Dolby 5.1 surround sound mix audio) – 3:46
3. "Fallen" (audio) – 4:36
4. "Lonely No More" (video) – 3:36
5. "Lonely No More" (teaser video clip) – 1:29

== Credits and personnel ==
Credits are adapted from the Australian CD single liner notes and the ...Something to Be booklet.

Studios

- Recorded at The Hit Factory (New York City), BiCoastal Music (Ossining, New York), Conway Studios, and Henson Studios (Los Angeles)
- Mixed at The Hit Factory (New York City)
- Mastered at Gateway Mastering (Portland, Maine, US)

Personnel

- Rob Thomas – writing, vocals
- Wendy Melvoin – guitar
- Jeff Trott – guitar
- Mike Elizondo – bass
- Matt Serletic – keys, production
- Gerald Heyward – drums
- Greater Anointing – background vocals
- Jimmy Douglass – recording, mixing
- Greg Collins – recording
- Mark Dobson – recording, digital editing
- Tony Maserati – additional mixing
- John O'Brien – programming
- Bob Ludwig – mastering
- Ria Lewerke – art direction
- Norman Moore – art direction
- Mark Seliger – photography

== Charts ==
=== Weekly charts ===
2005–2006 weekly chart performance for "Lonely No More"
Chart (2005–2006)	Peak position
Australia (ARIA)	3
Austria (Ö3 Austria Top 40)	24
Belgium (Ultratip Bubbling Under Flanders)	2
Canada AC Top 30 (Radio & Records)	1
Canada CHR/Pop Top 30 (Radio & Records)	9
Canada Hot AC Top 30 (Radio & Records)	1
CIS Airplay (TopHit)	8
Denmark (Tracklisten)	12
Europe (Eurochart Hot 100)	16
France (SNEP)	28
Germany (GfK)	16
Hungary (Rádiós Top 40)	1
Hungary (Dance Top 40)	40
Ireland (IRMA)	19
Italy (FIMI)	47
Netherlands (Dutch Top 40)	21
Netherlands (Single Top 100)	39
New Zealand (Recorded Music NZ)	9
Norway (VG-lista)	17
Poland (Nielsen Music Control)	1
Russia Airplay (TopHit)	7
Scotland Singles (Official Charts)	8
Spain (Promusicae)	6
Sweden (Sverigetopplistan)	10
Switzerland (Schweizer Hitparade)	24
UK Singles (Official Charts)	11
US Billboard Hot 100	6
US Adult Contemporary (Billboard)	1
US Adult Pop Airplay (Billboard)	1
US Dance Club Songs (Billboard)	1
US Dance Airplay (Billboard)	17
US Pop Airplay (Billboard)	9

2012 weekly chart performance for "Lonely No More"
Chart (2012)	Peak position
Ukraine Airplay (TopHit)	102

=== Year-end charts ===
2005 year-end chart performance for "Lonely No More"
Chart (2005)	Position
Australia (ARIA)	23
CIS Airplay (TopHit)	16
Hungary (Rádiós Top 40)	3
Romania (Romanian Top 100)	2
Russia Airplay (TopHit)	13
Sweden (Hitlistan)	83
UK Singles (OCC)	125
US Billboard Hot 100	22
US Adult Contemporary (Billboard)	7
US Adult Top 40 (Billboard)	3
US Mainstream Top 40 (Billboard)	28
Venezuela (Record Report)	11

2006 year-end chart performance for "Lonely No More"
Chart (2006)	Position
US Adult Contemporary (Billboard)	8

== Sales and certifications ==
Certifications and sales for "Lonely No More"
Region	Certification	Certified units/sales
Australia (ARIA)	Platinum	70,000^{^}
United States (RIAA)	Platinum	1,000,000^{‡}
^{^} Shipments figures based on certification alone.^{‡} Sales+streaming figures based on certification alone.

== Release history ==
Release dates and formats for "Lonely No More"
Region	Date	Format(s)	Label(s)	Ref.
United States	February 14, 2005	Contemporary hit; hot AC; triple A radio	Atlantic	
United States	February 28, 2005	Adult contemporary radio	Atlantic	
Australia	March 28, 2005	CD	Atlantic; Melisma	
United Kingdom	May 16, 2005	CD	Atlantic; Melisma	

== See also ==
- List of Adult Top 40 number-one songs of the 2000s
- List of number-one dance singles of 2005 (U.S.)
- List of Billboard Adult Contemporary number ones of 2005 and 2006
