= Streetcorner Symphony =

Single by Rob Thomas

from the album ...Something to Be
- Released: October 16, 2006
- Length: 4:07 (album version); 3:43 (single version)
- Label: Atlantic
- Songwriter(s): Rob Thomas, Matt Serletic
- Producer(s): Matt Serletic

Rob Thomas singles chronology
| "...Something to Be" (2006) | "Streetcorner Symphony" (2006) | "Little Wonders" (2007) |

"Streetcorner Symphony" is the fifth and final single from American singer-songwriter Rob Thomas's 2005 debut solo album, ...Something to Be. It was released on October 16, 2006. The song features John Mayer on lead guitar and backing vocals (though Mayer is not credited as an official artist).

This song has been featured on advertisements for ABC's Thursday-night lineup, including Ugly Betty, Grey's Anatomy, and Six Degrees. Thomas and his band sang it on Good Morning America.

== Music video ==
The video features concert footage of Thomas performing the song.

== Charts ==
=== Weekly charts ===
| Chart (2006–2007) | Peak position |
|---|---|
| Canada AC (Billboard) | 16 |
| Canada Hot AC (Billboard) | 2 |
| US Billboard Hot 100 | 64 |
| US Adult Contemporary (Billboard) | 4 |
| US Adult Pop Airplay (Billboard) | 5 |
| US Pop Airplay (Billboard) | 37 |
| US Pop 100 (Billboard) | 54 |

=== Year-end charts ===
| Chart (2007) | Position |
|---|---|
| US Adult Contemporary (Billboard) | 7 |
| US Adult Top 40 (Billboard) | 25 |

== Sales and certifications ==
| Region | Certification | Certified units/sales |
|---|---|---|
| United States (RIAA) | Gold | 500,000^{‡} |
^{‡} Sales+streaming figures based on certification alone.
