= EP (Matchbox Twenty EP) =

EP by Matchbox Twenty
- Released: November 11, 2003
- Genres: Alternative rock, pop rock
- Length: 22:55
- Label: Atlantic
- Producer: Matt Serletic

Matchbox Twenty chronology
More Than You Think You Are (2002)	EP (2003)	Exile on Mainstream (2007)

EP is an EP by American alternative rock band Matchbox Twenty. The EP comprises six songs, five of them being live and acoustic versions of songs from the band's previous three albums. The final track is the previously unreleased "Suffer Me", which was later included as a bonus track on the iTunes reissue of Mad Season. EP also includes an enhanced CD of a performance by the band at The Troubadour.

== Track listing ==
All tracks are written by Rob Thomas, except where noted.

No.	Title	Writer(s)	Length
1.	"Crutch" (Live from VH1 Storytellers)		3:18
2.	"Push" (Live at the Hard Rock Cafe in Orlando)	Thomas; Matt Serletic	4:19
3.	"All I Need" (Live in New Orleans)		3:51
4.	"If You're Gone" (Live)		4:30
5.	"Disease" (Acoustic)	Thomas; Mick Jagger	3:45
6.	"Suffer Me"		3:12

== Charts ==
Chart (2003)	Peak position
US Billboard 200	43
