= Phil Harder =

American music video director (born 1965)

- Born: Philip Harder; United States
- Occupations: Cinematographer, music video director, commercial director

Philip Harder (born 1965) is an American music video director and commercial director represented by Bob Industries in Santa Monica, California. Phil was also a director at Quentin Tarantino's A Band Apart Commercials and Music Videos where he directed award-winning commercials for clients including The Gap. He also had a music video company Harder/Fuller Films, from 1985 to 2005. In the 1980s, Harder was in the band Breaking Circus, as well as a founding member of Big Trouble House, a rock trio active throughout the 1990s.

Harder was the cinematographer on the Japanese feature film Yoko, The Cherry Blossom shot in Tokyo.

== Filmography ==
=== Music videos ===
1985

- The Jayhawks – "King of Kings"

1986

- Rifle Sport – "Burn 'Em Up"
- Sonic Youth – "Stereo Sanctity"

1987

- Agitpop – "Girl But Not a Friend"
- Big Black – "Dead Billy"
- Big Black – "Pigeon Kill"
- Big Black – "Cables"
- Big Black – "Big Money"
- Black Spot – "Bad Ass Hammer"
- The Didjits – "Max Wedge"
- The Didjits – "Axehandle"
- Naked Raygun – "Vanilla Blue"

1988

- Agitpop – "Stop Drop and Roll"
- Big Trouble House – "Afghanistan"
- Breaking Circus – "Shockhammer 13"
- Breaking Circus – "Evil Last Night"
- Breaking Circus – "Three Cool Cats"
- The Magnolias – "Pardon Me"
- Rapeman – "Hated Chinee"
- Rapeman – "Budd"
- Shane – "Ride, Ride, Ride"
- Soul Asylum – "P-9"

1989

- The Afghan Whigs – "Sister, Brother" (1989)
- Agitpop – "Forget Me Not" – (1989)
- Chicken Scratch – "Undertoe"
- Poopshovel – "One Pass Away" (1989)
- Soul Asylum – "Artificial Heart"

1990

- Another Carnival – "Rain on Me"
- Arson Garden – "Two Sisters"
- Babes in Toyland – "He's My Thing"
- Big Chief – "Drive It Off"
- Big Trouble House – "Black River"
- Big Trouble House – "Union Feed Grain Mill"
- Chicken Scratch – "Tom Takes Toilets To Tinseltown"
- Joe Henry (with Don Cherry) – "John Hanging"
- Brenda Kahn – "The Ballad of Ridge Street"
- Brenda Kahn – "If Red Were Blue"
- Libido Boyz – "Godzilla"

1991

- The Afghan Whigs – "Turn on the Water"
- The Afghan Whigs – "Conjure Me"
- The Afghan Whigs – "Miles Iz Ded"
- Another Carnival – "Still"
- Bone Club – "Apple"
- Drophammer – "Mind and Body"
- Firehose – "Walking the Cow"
- Brenda Kahn – "Eggs on Drugs"
- The Magnolias – "When I'm Not"
- The Magnolias – "Hello or Goodbye"
- Overwhelming Colorfast – "It's Tomorrow"

1992

- The Afghan Whigs – "Come See About Me"
- Steven "Jesse" Bernstein – "More Noise Please"
- Bone Club – "It's Not Alright"
- Chainsaw Kittens – "Connie I've Found The Door"
- Billy Childish and The Blackhands – "Crying Blud"
- Fat Tuesday – "High and Low"
- Joe Henry – "King's Highway"
- Kise – "Slop My Donkey"
- Seaweed – "Squint"
- Sick of It All – "Just Look Around"
- The Wedding Present – "No Christmas"
- The Wedding Present – "Boing"
- The Wedding Present – "Blue Eyes"
- The Wedding Present – "Chant of the Ever Circling Skeletal Family"

1993

- The Afghan Whigs – "Debonair"
- The Afghan Whigs – "Gentlemen"
- Babes in Toyland – "He's My Thing"
- Bailter Space – "X"
- Chainsaw Kittens – "Angel on the Range"
- Firehose – "Witness"
- Firehose – "Formal Introduction"
- Stigmata A-Go-Go – "Like Bone"
- Velocity Girl – "Audrey's Eyes"

1994

- The Afghan Whigs – "My Curse"
- Low – "Words"
- Mercy Rule -"Tell Tomorrow"
- Nova Mob – "Old Empire"
- Stigmata A-Go-Go – "Riot Keeper"

1995

- Ash – "Jack Names the Planets"
- Babes in Toyland – "Sweet 69"
- Compulsion – "Question Time for the Proles"
- Low – "Shame"
- Son Volt – "Drown"
- Venison – "Cooking Dirt"

1996

- Compulsion – "Juvenile Scene Detective"
- The Connells – "Fifth Fret"
- Failure – "Stuck on You" (co-directed with Ken Andrews)
- The Goops – "Vulgar Appetite"
- Low – "Over the Ocean"
- Red House Painters – "All Mixed Up"
- Versus – "Yeah You"

1997

- Bettie Serveert – "Rudder"
- Cornershop – "Brimful of Asha"
- Tanya Donelly – "The Bright Light"
- Hum – "Comin' Home"
- Local H – "Eddie Vedder"
- Local H – "Fritz's Corner"
- Lisa Loeb – "I Do"
- Bobby McFerrin – "Circle Song 6"
- Shudder to Think – "Red House"
- Souls – "Cello"

1998

- Cornershop – "Sleep on the Left Side"
- Esthero – "Heaven Sent"
- Everclear – "Rudolph the Red-Nosed Reindeer" (Gap Ad)
- Goodie Mob featuring Esthero - "The World I Know"
- Local H – "All the Kids Are Right"
- Mary Lou Lord – "Lights Are Changing"
- Johnny Mathis – "Most Wonderful Time of the Year" (Gap Ad)
- Mocrac – "In My Pocket"
- Scrawl – "Charles
- Rufus Wainwright – "What Are You Doing New Years' Eve?" (Gap Ad)

1999

- Barenaked Ladies – "Get in Line"
- The Cranberries – "Just My Imagination"
- Dovetail Joint – "Level on the Inside"
- Ben Lee – "Cigarettes Will Kill You"
- Moist – "Breathe"

2000

- Barenaked Ladies – "Pinch Me"
- Foo Fighters – "Next Year"
- Macy Gray – "Why Didn't You Call Me" (Target Ad)
- Incubus – "Stellar"
- Chantal Kreviazuk – "Faraway"

2001

- Barenaked Ladies – "Too Little Too Late"
- The Honeydogs – "Sour Grapes"
- Incubus – "Drive"
- Incubus – "Wish You Were Here"
- Mansun – "Fool"
- Matchbox Twenty – "Mad Season"
- Pulp – "The Trees"
- Remy Zero – "Save Me"

2002

- Local H – "Half Life"
- Mad at Gravity – "Walk Away"
- Chitlin' Fooks featuring Carol Van Dyk – "The Battle"
- The Dollyrots – "Tease Me, Pet Me" (Hewlett-Packard Ad)
- Low – "Canada"
- Matchbox Twenty – "Disease"

2003

- Barenaked Ladies – "Another Postcard"
- Liz Phair – "Why Can't I?"
- Shane – "End of the Line"

2004

- Barenaked Ladies – "Testing 1,2,3"
- The Music – "Breakin'"
- Liz Phair – "Extraordinary"
- Prince – "Cinnamon Girl"
- Skye Sweetnam – "Tangled Up in Me"
- Yellowcard – "Only One"

2005

- Aslyn – "Be the Girl"
- Hilary Duff – "Beat of My Heart"
- Low – "Monkey"
- Liz Phair – "Everything to Me"
- Stan Ridgway – "Beloved Movie Star"
- Rob Thomas – "Lonely No More" (Target Ad)

2006

- The Fratellis – "Flathead" (iPod Animated Commercial)
- The Fratellis – "Flathead" (iPod "Party" Commercial)
- Rob Thomas – "Ever the Same"

2007

- Cary Brothers – "Who You Are"
- Billy Talent – "Surrender"

2008

- Low – "Everybody's Song"
- The Owls – "Channel"
- The Afghan Whigs – "Algiers"

2009

- The Twilight Hours – "Alone"
- Zak Sally – "Why We Hide"
- Low – "Breaker"

2010

- Barenaked Ladies – "You Run Away"
- Bettie Serveert – "Pharmacy of Love"
- Low – "Cue The Strings"
- Low – "Death of a Salesman - Acoustic"

2011

- CSS featuring Ssion – "City Grrrl"
- Robert Plant – "Silver Rider"
- Nada Surf – "When I Was Young"
- Low – "Especially Me"
- Typsy Panthre – "All Fall Down"

2012

- The Script – "Six Degrees of Separation"
- Low – "Murderer"
- Typsy Panthre – "Hitch-Hiker"

2013

- Billy Talent – "Stand Up and Run"
- Low – "Just Make It Stop"
- The Starfolk – "Into The Clouds"

2014

- The Afghan Whigs – "Algiers"
- Trampled by Turtles – "Are You Behind the Shining Star"
- Trampled by Turtles – "Wild Animals"
- The Afghan Whigs – "Matamoros"
- The Afghan Whigs – "Lost in the Woods"
- Kevin Hearn – "Gallerina"

2015

- Matt Ellis – "Thank You Los Angeles"
- Rob Thomas – "Trust You"
- Billy Talent – "Chasing the Sun"

2016

- On An On – "Icon Love"

2017

- The Afghan Whigs – "Demon In Profile"

2020

- Greg Dulli – "Pantomima"

2023

- Barenaked Ladies – "One Night"

=== Films ===
Year	Film	Awards and nominations	Ref.
2008	Flying Lesson (collaboration with chameckilerner)	Won – Brooklyn Film Festival – Best Experimental Film; Won - Dance On Camera Festival - Jury Award	
2010	Jackie & Judy (collaboration with chameckilerner)	Won - Berlin Pool Dance-Video Film Festival - PEARL Award	
2013	Low Movie: How to Quit Smoking		
2019	Tuscaloosa		
2021	The Claw		
