= Exile on Mainstream =

Compilation album by Matchbox Twenty
- Released: October 2, 2007
- Recorded: 1996–2002; 2007
- Genre: Alternative rock; post-grunge; pop punk
- Length: 70:07
- Label: Atlantic
- Producer: Steve Lillywhite; Matt Serletic

Matchbox Twenty chronology
More Than You Think You Are (2002)	Exile on Mainstream (2007)	North (2012)

Singles from Exile on Mainstream
- 1. "How Far We've Come" Released: September 4, 2007; 2. "All Your Reasons" Released: January 18, 2008 (Australia); 3. "These Hard Times" Released: January 29, 2008

Professional ratings
Review scores
Source	Rating
AllMusic	4.0/5 stars
Alternative Addiction	4.0/5 stars
Blender	2/5 stars
Sputnikmusic	3.5/5 stars

Exile on Mainstream is the first compilation album by American rock band Matchbox Twenty. The album was released in two parts: the first was an EP, featuring seven new songs that emerged from a 12-song recording session, produced by Steve Lillywhite. The other part consists of remastered versions of 11 of the band's biggest hits.

== Recording ==
Matchbox Twenty had been on hiatus since 2005, when Adam Gaynor had left the band. In 2007, the remaining four group members reunited in Los Angeles to do a compilation album, and ended up recording seven new songs over the course of one session. For the first time, every member of the group worked on songwriting. All seven of the new songs on the album were credited to the members of Matchbox Twenty, a first for the group. Prior to this, the songs either were credited to Rob Thomas himself or co-written with various members of the band. Paul Doucette, originally the band's drummer, played rhythm guitar due to Adam Gaynor's departure.

The album's title is a reference to the Rolling Stones' Exile on Main St.

== Release ==
The album was available for pre-order on September 4, 2007, from iTunes. The full album was released on VH1's "The Leak" one week before release. It leaked onto the Internet on September 28, 2007, four days ahead of the official release date. The album was released on October 2, 2007, exactly 11 years and one day since the release of the band's debut album, Yourself or Someone Like You. The album debuted on the Australian ARIA Albums Chart on October 8, 2007, at number-one with sales of 18,199 units. In the U.S., the album debuted at number-three on the Billboard 200 chart, selling 131,000 copies in its first week. The album was released in a USB wristband format as well as the 2-CD edition making Matchbox Twenty the first band to do so.

The first single, "How Far We've Come", was released on July 16, 2007, and charted in the top 10 in Australia and in the top 20 in the United States. Paul Doucette announced in mid-October that "These Hard Times" would be released as the album's second single in early 2008. In Australia, "All Your Reasons" was released as the second single instead of "These Hard Times", and the single is available on the Australian iTunes Store.

The album has sold 660,319 copies as of June 7, 2008 and was certified gold in the United States.

== Track listing ==
All tracks are written by Rob Thomas, Paul Doucette, Kyle Cook, and Brian Yale except where noted.

Exile on Mainstream – Disc one
No.	Title	Writer(s)	Length
1.	"How Far We've Come"		3:31
2.	"I'll Believe You When"		3:16
3.	"All Your Reasons"		2:40
4.	"These Hard Times"		3:48
5.	"If I Fall"	Thomas	2:48
6.	"Can't Let You Go"	Thomas	3:28
7.	"Come Dancing" (iTunes pre-order / International Digital Download)	Ray Davies
Total length:			23:50

Exile on Mainstream Best Buy Bonus Tracks – Disc one
No.	Title	Writer(s)	Length
7.	"Remedy" (live)	Chris Robinson; Rich Robinson	4:32
8.	"Modern Love" (live)	David Bowie	3:51

All tracks are written by Rob Thomas except where noted.

Exile on Mainstream – Disc two
No.	Title	Writer(s)	Original Album	Length
1.	"Long Day"		Yourself or Someone Like You	3:45
2.	"Push"	Thomas; Matt Serletic	Yourself or Someone Like You	3:57
3.	"3 A.M."	Thomas; Brian Yale; John Leslie Goff; Jay Joseph Stanley	Yourself or Someone Like You	3:44
4.	"Real World"		Yourself or Someone Like You	3:50
5.	"Back 2 Good"	Thomas; Serletic	Yourself or Someone Like You	5:37
6.	"Bent"		Mad Season	4:16
7.	"If You're Gone"		Mad Season	4:34
8.	"Mad Season"		Mad Season	5:07
9.	"Disease"	Thomas; Mick Jagger	More Than You Think You Are	3:38
10.	"Unwell"		More Than You Think You Are	3:48
11.	"Bright Lights"		More Than You Think You Are	4:01
Total length:				46:17

=== Exile on Mainstream Revisited ===
All tracks are written by Rob Thomas except where noted.

Side One
No.	Title	Writer(s)	Length
1.	"How Far We've Come"	Rob Thomas; Paul Doucette; Kyle Cook; Brian Yale	3:31
2.	"I'll Believe You When"	Thomas; Doucette; Cook; Yale	3:16
3.	"All Your Reasons"	Thomas; Doucette; Cook; Yale	2:40
4.	"These Hard Times"	Thomas; Doucette; Cook; Yale	3:48

Side Two
No.	Title	Writer(s)	Original Album	Length
1.	"If I Fall"			2:48
2.	"Can't Let You Go"			3:28
3.	"Come Dancing"	Ray Davies	Exile on Mainstream (iTunes Version)	3:38
4.	"You & I & I"		Mad Season (Deluxe Edition)	3:29

Side Three
No.	Title	Writer(s)	Original Album	Length
1.	"Never Going Back Again"	Lindsey Buckingham	Mad Season (Deluxe Edition)	3:47
2.	"Suffer Me"		Mad Season (Deluxe Edition)	3:12
3.	"So Sad, So Lonely"		More Than You Think You Are	3:45
4.	"Waiting on a Train"		North (Deluxe/Target Edition)	2:59

Side Four
No.	Title	Writer(s)	Original Album	Length
1.	"I Don't Wanna Be Loved"	Thomas; Doucette; Cook	North (Japanese/Target Edition)	3:34
2.	"I Believe in Everything"	Thomas; Doucette; Cook	North (Japanese/Deluxe Edition)	3:39
3.	"Straight for This Life"	Thomas; Doucette; Cook	North (Japanese/Deluxe Edition)	3:16
4.	"Help Me Through This"	Thomas; Doucette; Cook	North (Japanese Edition)	3:34

== Personnel ==
- Rob Thomas – lead vocals, piano, acoustic guitar
- Kyle Cook – lead guitar, backing vocals
- Adam Gaynor – rhythm guitar and backing vocals on Disc 2
- Paul Doucette – drums on Disc 2, rhythm guitar and backing vocals on Disc 1
- Brian Yale – bass
- Ryan MacMillan – drums on Disc 1

== Charts ==
=== Weekly charts ===
Chart (2007)	Peak position
Australian Albums (ARIA)	1
Austrian Albums (Ö3 Austria)	54
Canadian Albums (Billboard)	8
Dutch Albums (Album Top 100)	98
German Albums (Offizielle Top 100)	28
Irish Albums (IRMA)	9
New Zealand Albums (RMNZ)	2
Scottish Albums (OCC)	47
Swiss Albums (Schweizer Hitparade)	46
UK Albums (OCC)	53
US Billboard 200	3
US Top Alternative Albums (Billboard)	1
US Top Rock Albums (Billboard)	1

=== Year-end charts ===
Chart (2007)	Position
Australian Albums (ARIA)	11
New Zealand Albums (RMNZ)	24
US Billboard 200	162

Chart (2008)	Position
Australian Albums (ARIA)	27
US Billboard 200	116

== Certifications ==
Region	Certification	Certified units/sales
Australia (ARIA)	3× Platinum	210,000^{^}
Canada (Music Canada)	Gold	50,000^{^}
New Zealand (RMNZ)	Platinum	15,000^{^}
United Kingdom (BPI)	Silver	60,000^{‡}
United States (RIAA)	Gold	500,000^{^}
^{^} Shipments figures based on certification alone.^{‡} Sales+streaming figures based on certification alone.
