= Mad Season =

Mad Season can refer to:

- Mad Season (band)
- Mad Season (Matchbox Twenty album), 2000
  - "Mad Season" (song), title song of the album
- Mad Season (Twiztid album), 2020
