= Smokers' Paradise =

EP by Breaking Circus
- Released: 1987
- Genre: Post-punk
- Label: Homestead
- Producer: Iain Burgess

Breaking Circus chronology
The Ice Machine (1986)	Smokers' Paradise (1987)

Smokers' Paradise is an extended play by Breaking Circus. It was released in 1987 on Homestead Records. It is the first and only Breaking Circus release to feature second guitarist Phil Harder. It was intended as a full-length album with four songwriting contributions each from Björklund, Flour, and Trainer. When Homestead Records insisted that it be a six-song EP (possibly due to budget restrictions), Flour and Trainer's contributions were limited to one song each, while all of Björklund's songs appeared on the record.

== Critical reception ==
Professional ratings
Review scores
Source	Rating
AllMusic	4/5 stars

Trouser Press called the EP "an eerie and innovative pleasure."

== Track listing ==
1. "Smokers' Paradise"
2. "Three Cool Cats"
3. "ShockHammer Thirteen"
4. "Emperor Calvin"
5. "Medicine Lake"
6. "Eat Lead"

== Personnel ==
- Steve Björklund - vocals, guitar
- Phil Harder - guitar
- Flour - bass, vocals
- Todd Trainer - drums, vocals
- Iain Burgess - producer
