= Lamprey (disambiguation) =

A lamprey is a parasitic aquatic vertebrate with a toothed, funnel-like sucking mouth.

Lamprey may refer to:

- Lamprey (surname)
- Lamprey River, a river in southeastern New Hampshire, U.S.
- Lamprey (comics), a character from Marvel Comics' original Squadron Supreme series
- Lamprey (G.I. Joe), a set of fictional characters in the G.I. Joe universe
- Lamprey (album), an album by Bettie Serveert
- USS Lamprey (SS-372), a Balao-class submarine of the United States Navy
- Lamprey, a Beast General character in Shadow Raiders
- Lamprey, a character in A Trick to Catch the Old One
- Lamprey, Manitoba, an unincorporated place in Manitoba, Canada
  - Lamprey railway station in Lamprey, Manitoba, Canada

== See also ==
- Lampiri (disambiguation)
- Lampre, an Italian steel producer and cycling team sponsor
