= Luciana achugar =

Uruguayan-American dancer and choreographer

luciana achugar
- Born: 27 August 1970 (age 56); Montevideo, Uruguay
- Education: California Institute of the Arts
- Occupations: Choreographer, dancer
- Years active: 1999–present
- Dancing career
- Dances: Otro Teatro
- Website: www.lachugar.org

luciana achugar (born 27 August 1970) is a Uruguayan–American choreographer and dancer. Based in Brooklyn, she creates contemporary dance pieces which have been presented at the Danspace Project, The Kitchen, the Dance Theater Workshop, the Fusebox Festival, and the Walker Art Center. Her works explore themes of decolonization and incorporate elements of audience engagement and the breaking of the fourth wall.

Born in Montevideo, achugar earned a BFA from the California Institute of the Arts. She has been a performer for chameckilerner and John Jasperse. She has received two Bessie Awards and a Guggenheim Fellowship.

== Early life and education ==
Luciana achugar was born in 1970 in Montevideo, Uruguay to Marxist political activist parents. When she was four years old, her family fled to Venezuela.

She earned her BFA in dance from the California Institute of the Arts in 1995 and moved to New York the same year.

== Dance and choreography ==
Early in her career, achugar danced for various choreographers, some of whom were involved in the New York downtown dance scene. Her choreographers included chameckilerner, John Jasperse, Jeremy Nelson, Maria Hassabi, and Wil Swanson. From 1999 to 2003, achugar created works in collaboration with dancer Levi Gonzalez. In their 2001 piece Hit, dancers repeatedly slap each other. After 2002, achugar composed pieces for all-female casts. A Super Natural Return to Love 2004 was her first group work and, for achugar, a manifesto. Dancers clad in blue smocks, reminiscent of women factory workers of World War II have an initially synchronized choreography, with "a similar camp aesthetic" to that of Busby Berkeley in 1930s musicals. The synchronicity erodes as the piece proceeds, and red paint drips down their dancers' fishnet-stockinged hips as they assume crab-like postures, "moving like B-movie groin-headed creatures from an alien invasion theme".

Achugar's works belong to contemporary dance, incorporating audience engagement and the breaking of the fourth wall and exploring themes of decolonization through the erasure of hierarchy and the subversion of gaze. She has created several original works which have been performed throughout the United States and in Uruguay as well as international festivals. Her works have been presented at the Fusebox Festival and by Movement Research.

Her 2006 work Exhausting Love was performed at Danspace Project. She was one of the creators of the group piece Franny and Zooey in 2007. Her work The Sublime is Us was performed at the Dance Theater Workshop in October 2008. The piece used mirrors and involved breaking the fourth wall. Her work at The Kitchen, Puro Deseo, was reviewed by the Village Voice, which found that achugar "has always investigated—celebrated—the primal in her compelling pieces". For the 2012 River to River Festival achugar presented FEELingpleasuresatisfactioncelebrationholyFORM in Battery Park City. The work was shown in May 2012 at the Abrons Arts Center. The piece includes "ritualistic repetition of articulated leg positions" and naked dancers who attempt to put on denim jeans without the use of their hands.

Her work Otro Teatro premiered at the Walker Art Center in 2014 and included performers situated in the audience. It was also performed at the New York Live Arts theater in 2014. A reviewer compared the performance to those of The Living Theatre, describing it as "audacious but tough to endure." The work was performed in Montevideo, Uruguay, at the Zavala Muniz room in December 2014.

She took part in the 2014 body-as-sculpture exhibition Le Mouvement at the Centre PasquArt in Biel, Switzerland. Her piece, The Pleasure Project , through its use of the nudity of "uncomfortable" bodies, was one of the only works to address sexuality. Her piece Puro Teatro: A Spell for Utopia debuted at the Chocolate Factory Theater in 2021.

Achugar has received two Bessie Awards. In 2011, she was named to Dance Magazine's "25 to Watch". She was awarded with a Creative Capital grant and a Guggenheim Fellowship in 2013. She received an Herb Alpert Award in the Arts in 2017. She was a 2022 Doris Duke Fellow at Bennington College where she has undertaken master's coursework.
