= All Your Reasons =

Single by Matchbox Twenty

from the album Exile on Mainstream
- Released: 18 January 2008
- Recorded: 2007
- Genre: Pop punk, pop rock
- Length: 2:40
- Label: Atlantic
- Songwriter(s): Rob Thomas, Paul Doucette, Kyle Cook, Brian Yale
- Producer(s): Steve Lillywhite

Matchbox Twenty singles chronology
"How Far We've Come" (2007)	"All Your Reasons" (2008)	"These Hard Times" (2008)

"All Your Reasons" is a song from Matchbox Twenty's fourth album, Exile on Mainstream. It was released in Australia as the second single from the album, while in the rest of the world, "These Hard Times" was released as the second single.

== Track listing ==
1. "All Your Reasons" (album version) – 2:40
2. "How Far We've Come" (Rosario + Craig J Rock Royalty radio edit) – 3:50
3. "Disease" (Live from The Blue Room) – 3:36

== Personnel ==
- Rob Thomas - lead vocals
- Kyle Cook - electric guitar, mandolin, backing vocals
- Paul Doucette - acoustic guitar, backing vocals
- Brian Yale - bass
- Ryan MacMillan - drums

== Charts ==
Chart (2008)	Peak position
Australia (ARIA)	34

== Awards and nominations ==
=== APRA Award ===
- 2009 Most Played Foreign Work win for "All Your Reasons" written by Kyle Cook, Rob Thomas, Paul Doucette, Brian Yale presented by Australasian Performing Right Association.
