= The Very Long Fuse =

EP by Breaking Circus
- Released: 1985
- Genre: Post-punk
- Label: Homestead
- Producer: Iain Burgess

Breaking Circus chronology
The Very Long Fuse (1985)	The Ice Machine (1986)

The Very Long Fuse is the debut EP by American post-punk band Breaking Circus. It was released in 1985 by on Homestead Records.

== Critical reception ==
Professional ratings
Review scores
Source	Rating
AllMusic	4/5 stars
Robert Christgau	B+

Trouser Press called the EP "terse, post-punk vitriol set to a banging dance-beat drum machine."

== Track listing ==
1. "Precision"
2. "(Knife in the) Marathon"
3. "Lady in the Lake"
4. "Soul of Japan"
5. "The Imperial Clawmasters' Theme"
6. "Monster's Sanctuary"
7. "Christian Soldiers"
8. "Morning"

== Personnel ==
- Steve Björklund – guitar, bass, Roland TR-606 drum machine
- Steve Albini – cover artwork
