= Stick It (disambiguation) =

Stick It may refer to:

== Film and TV ==
- Stick It, a 2006 comedy film starring Jeff Bridges and Missy Peregrym.
- "Stick It", a 2006 episode of the TV series Boston Legal

== Music ==
- Stick It (band), an American rock band from Florida
- Stick It (Great White album), a 1984 album by the American rock band, Great White
- Stick It (Buddy Rich album), a 1972 album by jazz drummer Buddy Rich
- Stick It!, a 1990 album by Agitpop

=== Songs ===
- "Stick It", a song by Chris Rea from the 1980 album, Tennis (album)
- "Stick It", a song by Raven from the 1988 album, Nothing Exceeds Like Excess
- "Stick it", a song by Keith Anderson from the album, Three Chord Country and American Rock & Roll
