= Attagirl =

Attagirl may refer to:

- Attagirl (album), a 2005 album by the Dutch band Bettie Serveert, and a track in it
- Attagirl (TV series), a Philippine sitcom
- Attagirl, nickname for female pilots in the UK Air Transport Auxiliary (1940–45)
