= Voice of Reason =

Voice of Reason or The Voice of Reason may refer to:

== Literature ==
- A Voice of Reason: Reflections on Australia, a book by Ian Lowe
- The Voice of Reason, a book by Ayn Rand, Leonard Peikoff, and Peter Schwartz
- "The Voice of Reason", a short story by Andrzej Sapkowski in his 1993 Witcher collection The Last Wish

== Music ==
- Voice of Reason (Harem Scarem album) or the title song, 1995
- Voice of Reason (Rifle Sport album), 1983
- Voice of Reason, an album by the Fountainhead, 1988
- The Voice of Reason, an album by Miilkbone, 2015
- "Voice of Reason" (song), by Noiseworks, 1989
- "Voice of Reason", a song by I Like Trains from Elegies to Lessons Learnt, 2007
- "The Voice of Reason", a song by Asia from Aqua, 1992

== Other uses ==
- "Voice of Reason" (Doctors), a 2003 television episode
- "The Voice of Reason" (The Outer Limits), a 1995 television episode
- "Voice of Reason", a touring comedy show by Dara Ó Briain
- Voice of Reason (political party), a far-right, ultranationalist political party in Greece
