= The Ice Machine =

Studio album by Breaking Circus
- Released: 1986
- Genre: Post-punk
- Label: Homestead
- Producer: Iain Burgess

Breaking Circus chronology
The Very Long Fuse (1985)	The Ice Machine (1986)	Smokers' Paradise (1987)

The Ice Machine is an album by Breaking Circus. It was released in 1986 by Homestead Records.

== Track listing ==
Side 1:

1. "Song of the South" (Steve Björklund, Pete Conway, and Todd Trainer)
2. "Ancient Axes" (Björklund)
3. "Daylight" (Björklund)
4. "Caskets and Clocks" (Trainer)
5. "Deadly China Doll" (Björklund)
6. "Laid So Low" (Björklund)

Side 2:

1. "Took a Hammering" (Björklund and Trainer)
2. "Walter" (Björklund)
3. "Swept Blood" (Conway)
4. "Where" (Trainer)
5. "Gun Shy" (Björklund, Conway, and Trainer)
6. "Evil Last Night" (Björklund)

== Personnel ==
- Steve Björklund - guitar, vocals
- Flour - bass
- Todd Trainer - drums, vocals
- Iain Burgess - producer
- Steve Albini - liner artwork
