= Flour (band) =

American musical project

Flour is the musical project and nickname of Minneapolis musician Pete Conway, who wrote songs and played bass guitar in the bands Rifle Sport and Breaking Circus until the mid-1980s. He released four solo albums on Touch and Go Records from 1988 to 1994 on which he plays most of the instruments himself. Flour toured as a live band twice with a lineup that featured ex-Big Black guitarist Steve Albini on bass and former Breaking Circus percussionist Todd Trainer on drums before they went on to form the band Shellac. Flour's solo recordings feature the drum machine sound characteristic of Big Black, which was also toyed with by many other independent rock bands in the Midwest during that time period. Flour's third solo album Machinery Hill was described by Allmusic's Richard Foss as "an oddball masterpiece of grinding guitar, fluid bass, hammering drums, and very creative ideas".

In the mid-1990s, Conway was part of an all-bass trio, called Brits Out of America, along with Dana Cochrane of Mickey Finn, Amy Larson of Strumpet, and Ben Ivascu of Polica, STNNNG, Marijuana Deathsquads, etc. In 1992, Conway performed as the bass player on the supergroup Pigface's "Fook You '92" tour.

== Album discography ==
=== Solo albums ===
- Flour LP (1988)
- Luv 713 LP (1990)
- Machinery Hill LP, CD (1991)
- Fourth and Final CD (1994)

==== Collections ====
- Luv 713/Flour CD (1990)

=== As a band member ===
==== With Breaking Circus ====
- The Ice Machine (Homestead Records HMS075, 1986)
- Smokers' Paradise EP (Homestead Records HMS092, 1987)

==== With Rifle Sport ====
- Voice of Reason (Reflex Records Reflex-E, 1983)
- "Complex EP" (Ruthless Records RRRS-014, 1985)
- White (Made In France) (Ruthless Records RRRS-016, 1987)
- Live At The Entry, Dead At The Exit (Ruthless Records RRRS-021, 1989)
- Primo (Big Money-Ruthless BMI-011, 1991)
