= Bright Lights (Matchbox Twenty song) =

2003 single by Matchbox Twenty

Single by Matchbox Twenty

from the album More Than You Think You Are
- Released: July 28, 2003
- Studio: Bearsville (Bearsville, New York); The Hit Factory (New York City)
- Genre: Alternative rock
- Length: 3:54
- Label: Atlantic
- Songwriter: Rob Thomas
- Producer: Matt Serletic

Matchbox Twenty singles chronology
"Unwell" (2003)	"Bright Lights" (2003)	"Downfall" (2004)

"Bright Lights" is a song by American alternative rock group Matchbox Twenty. The song was released on July 28, 2003, as the third single from their third album, More Than You Think You Are (2002). "Bright Lights" peaked at number 23 on the US Billboard Hot 100 and reached the top 50 in Australia and New Zealand.

== Content ==
The song was written by lead singer Rob Thomas, and is about a girl who leaves her hometown to pursue an unspecified career of some fame, possibly Broadway. Throughout the song, he pleads with the girl to let her know that she is encouraged to return home if things don't work out. According to Thomas, "Bright Lights" may be his favorite song he has recorded.

== Music video ==
The video is taken directly from footage released on the DVD Show: A Night in the Life of Matchbox Twenty, and as such, is a live performance. As he also does in the studio version of the song, Thomas plays the piano, and towards the end, lead guitarist Kyle Cook jumps atop the piano.

== Track listing ==
- UK and Australian CD single
1. "Bright Lights"
2. "Disease" (live)
3. "Bright Lights" (live)

== Credits and personnel ==
Credits are taken from the More Than You Think You Are album booklet.

Studios

- Recorded at Bearsville Studios (Bearsville, New York) and The Hit Factory (New York City)
- Mixed at The Hit Factory (New York City)
- Mastered at Marcussen Mastering (Hollywood, California)

Personnel

- Rob Thomas – writing, vocals, piano
- Kyle Cook – background vocals, lead guitar
- Adam Gaynor – background vocals, rhythm guitar
- Brian Yale – bass
- Paul Doucette – drums, percussion
- Greg Leisz – pedal steel
- Matt Serletic – keyboards, production
- Greg Collins – recording, additional mixing
- Jim Scott – mixing
- Chris Testa – mixing assistance
- Mark Dodson – Pro Tools, digital editing, additional engineering
- Pat Woodward – additional engineering
- Stephen Marcussen – mastering
- Stewart Whitmore – mastering

== Charts ==
=== Weekly charts ===
Chart (2003)	Peak position
Australia (ARIA)	26
New Zealand (Recorded Music NZ)	48
US Billboard Hot 100	23
US Adult Pop Airplay (Billboard)	2
US Pop Airplay (Billboard)	15

=== Year-end charts ===
Chart (2003)	Position
US Adult Top 40 (Billboard)	27
US Mainstream Top 40 (Billboard)	92

Chart (2004)	Position
US Adult Top 40 (Billboard)	7
US Mainstream Top 40 (Billboard)	88

== Certifications ==
Region	Certification	Certified units/sales
United States (RIAA)	Platinum	1,000,000^{‡}
^{‡} Sales+streaming figures based on certification alone.

== Release history ==
Region	Date	Format(s)	Label(s)	Ref.
United States	July 28, 2003	Hot adult contemporary; triple A radio	Atlantic	
United States	August 11, 2003	Contemporary hit radio	Atlantic	
Australia	September 15, 2003	CD	Atlantic	
United Kingdom	September 15, 2003	CD	Atlantic	
