= Oh, Mayhem! =

Studio album by Bettie Serveert
- Released: February 5, 2013
- Genre: Indie rock
- Length: 34:19
- Label: Palomine Records

Bettie Serveert chronology
Pharmacy of Love (2010)	Oh, Mayhem! (2013)	Damaged Good (2016)

Singles from Oh, Mayhem!
- 1. "Shake-Her" Released: 2013; 2. "Monogamous" Released: 2013; 3. "Had2Beyou" Released: 2013

Oh, Mayhem! is the ninth studio album by Dutch indie rock band Bettie Serveert, released on February 5, 2013, on Palomine Records.

Professional ratings
Aggregate scores
Source	Rating
Metacritic	79/100
Review scores
Source	Rating
AllMusic	4/5 stars
Exclaim!	7/10
MSN Music (Expert Witness)	(3-star Honorable Mention)
PopMatters	7/10 stars

== Track listing ==
1. "Shake-Her" – 2:25
2. "Mayhem" – 4:05
3. "Sad Dog" – 3:58
4. "Had2Byou" – 2:21
5. "Tuf Skin" – 2:40
6. "Monogamous" – 2:23
7. "Receiver" (alternative version) – 5:02
8. "LoserTrack" – 4:07
9. "iPromise – 3:53
10. "D.I.Y." – 3:22

== Personnel ==
- Carol Van Dyk – vocals, guitar
- Peter Visser – guitar
- Herman Bunskoeke – bass guitar
- Joppe Molenaar – drums
