= Lampiri =

Lampiri may refer to several villages in Greece:

- Lampiri, a village in the community Ziria, Achaea
- Lampiri, Aetolia-Acarnania, a village in the municipality Agrinio

== See also ==
- Lamprey (disambiguation)
