= Last Beautiful Girl =

2001 single by Matchbox Twenty

Single by Matchbox Twenty

from the album Mad Season
- Released: September 4, 2001
- Length: 4:03
- Label: Atlantic; Lava
- Songwriters: Rob Thomas; Matt Serletic
- Producer: Matt Serletic

Matchbox Twenty singles chronology
"Mad Season" (2001)	"Last Beautiful Girl" (2001)	"Disease" (2002)

"Last Beautiful Girl" is a song by American rock band Matchbox Twenty. It was released as the fifth and final single from their second album, Mad Season (2000), reaching number 20 on the Billboard Adult Top 40 chart and number 96 on the UK Singles Chart.

== Content ==
The narrator is reflecting on a relationship gone bad and a girl who knew all the right things to say at all the wrong times.

== Track listing ==
- UK maxi-CD single
1. "Last Beautiful Girl"
2. "Push" (live)
3. "Bent" (live)

== Charts ==
=== Weekly charts ===
Chart (2001)	Peak position
UK Singles (Official Charts)	96
US Bubbling Under Hot 100 (Billboard)	13
US Adult Pop Airplay (Billboard)	20

=== Year-end charts ===
Chart (2001)	Position
US Adult Top 40 (Billboard)	65

Chart (2002)	Position
US Adult Top 40 (Billboard)	82

== Release history ==
Region	Date	Format(s)	Label(s)	Ref.
United States	September 4, 2001	Contemporary hit; hot AC; triple A radio	Atlantic; Lava	
Australia	November 12, 2001	CD	Atlantic; Lava	
United Kingdom	December 10, 2001	CD	Atlantic; Lava	
