= Pharmacy of Love =

Studio album by Bettie Serveert
- Released: 23 March 2010
- Recorded: Waimes, Belgium
- Genre: Indie rock
- Length: 37:57
- Label: Second Motion Records

Bettie Serveert chronology
| Bare Stripped Naked (2006) | Pharmacy of Love (2010) | Oh, Mayhem! (2013) |

Singles from Pharmacy of Love
- 1. "Deny All" Released: 2010; 2. "The Pharmacy" Released: 2010

Pharmacy of Love is the eighth studio album by Dutch indie rock band Bettie Serveert. It was released on 23 March 2010 on Second Motion Records.

== Critical reception ==
Professional ratings
Review scores
| Source | Rating |
|---|---|
| AllMusic | 3.5/5 stars |
| Altsounds | 80% |
| Entertainment Weekly | B |
| Exclaim! | (favorable) |
| PopMatters | 6/10 stars |
| Robert Christgau | (3-star Honorable Mention) |
| Under the Radar | 6/10 |

Several critics gave Pharmacy of Love mixed reviews and/or described it as a return to Bettie Serveert's musical roots.

== Track listing ==
1. "Deny All" – 3:02
2. "Semaphore" – 3:32
3. "Love Lee" – 3:40
4. "Mossie" – 3:12
5. "The Pharmacy" – 3:49
6. "Souls Travel" – 2:47
7. "Calling" – 9:32
8. "Change4me" – 4:10
9. "What They Call Love" (Loud Version) – 4:13

== Personnel ==
- Carol Van Dyk – vocals/guitar
- Peter Visser – guitar
- Herman Bunskoeke – bass
- Joppe Molenaar – drums
