= Breaking Circus =

American post-punk band

- Origin: Chicago, Illinois, USA
- Genres: Alternative rock, post-punk
- Years active: 1984–1988
- Label: Homestead Records
- Past members: Steve Björklund; Peter Conway; Todd Trainer; Phil Harder; Tony Pucci

Breaking Circus was a post-punk band from the 1980s, based in Chicago and later Minneapolis, founded by guitarist and vocalist Steve Björklund.

== History ==
Björklund had played guitar and sang for Chicago punk band Strike Under after a short stint in the group Terminal Beach, Breaking Circus was his next project, originally with bassist Bruce Lange and a Roland TR-606 drum machine. Breaking Circus signed to Homestead Records for their first release, The Very Long Fuse EP (1985), featuring the song "Marathon", which has been cited as "stuck in several thousand heads" and a "college-radio favorite"

In 1986, Björklund moved to Minneapolis and began working with Rifle Sport bassist Pete "Flour" Conway and drummer/guitarist Todd Trainer. In 1986 the band released a song, Driving the Dynamite Truck on the Twin/Tone compilation Big Hits of Mid-America Volume Four, with a slightly different lineup having Tony Pucci of Man Sized Action in the drummer's chair. Homestead Records released the band's The Ice Machine LP with the album's credits appearing as a Monopoly-style drinking game insert.

Guitarist Phil Harder filled out the band for a national tour before Breaking Circus returned home to record another LP that was to feature four songs by Björklund, four by Conway, and four by Trainer. When the band arrived in the studio, they received word from Homestead that the label would only pay for six of the twelve songs that they had originally planned to record. All four of Björklund's songs and one by each of the other members were recorded and released as the EP Smokers' Paradise in 1987. The band broke up in 1988.

== Post-Circus ==
Phil Harder became a music video director and went on to form the trio Big Trouble House. Pete Conway recorded four full-length solo albums as Flour for Touch and Go Records. Todd Trainer released two EPs under the name Brick Layer Cake before founding Shellac with Steve Albini and Bob Weston. Björklund released a final 7" single of solo electropop versions of songs by Naked Raygun and the UK Subs under the name Breaking Circus. He was briefly in the band Balloon Guy before moving on to work as a producer. In the 2010s Björklund returned to making music, forming the band High Value Target with his wife, Liz Björklund, and former Effigies drummer Steve Economou. The group released an EP in 2012.

== Legacy ==
Driving the Dynamite Truck was later covered by the band Seam on the Kernel EP, and later by Björklund's own group, High Value Target.

Poet Stephanie Burt paid homage to the group in her 2013 collection, Belmont. Burt's poem cites the band's college radio hit, "(Knife in the) Marathon", lists the group's entire catalog, namechecks bassist Pete Conway's pseudonym, and refers to the band's slip into obscurity by stating, "I write about you now since nobody else is likely to."

== Discography ==
=== Studio releases ===
- The Very Long Fuse EP (Homestead) (1985)
- The Ice Machine (Homestead) (1986)
- Smokers' Paradise EP (Homestead) (1987)
- "Home of the Brave" 7" single - included with issue 4 of The Pope fanzine.

=== Compilation appearances ===
- Big Hits Of Mid-America, Volume IV (Twin/Tone) (1986) - "Driving The Dynamite Truck"
- Oh! You Mean Minneapolis cassette (Skull Duggery) (1986) - "Antient Axes (special demo version)", "Soul of Japan (live)"
- The Wailing Ultimate-The Homestead Records Compilation (Homestead) (1987) - "Song Of The South"
- Minneapolis Bonus cassette EP (Skull Duggery) (1988) - "Song Of The South (live)"

== See also ==
- List of alternative rock artists
- Music of Minnesota
