= Palomine =

Studio album by Bettie Serveert
- Released: 2 November 1992
- Studio: Sound Enterprise (Weesp)
- Genre: Indie rock; indie pop
- Length: 49:12
- Label: Brinkman; Guernica; Matador
- Producer: Bettie Serveert; Frans Hagenaars; Edwin "Hank" Heath

Bettie Serveert chronology
Palomine (1992)	Lamprey (1995)

Singles from Palomine
- 1. "Tom Boy" Released: 1992; 2. "Palomine" Released: 1992; 3. "Kid's Allright" Released: 1993

Palomine is the debut studio album by Dutch indie rock band Bettie Serveert. It was released on 2 November 1992 by Brinkman Records and Guernica, and by Matador Records in the United States the following year.

== Release ==
Palomine was released on 2 November 1992 by Brinkman Records in the Benelux and by the 4AD subsidiary label Guernica in the United Kingdom. Upon its release, the album charted at number 43 in the Netherlands. In the United States, it was issued by Matador Records on 7 January 1993. Three singles were released from Palomine: "Tom Boy" and "Palomine" in 1992, the second of which reached number 122 on the UK Singles Chart, and "Kid's Allright" in 1993.

On 7 July 2023, Matador reissued Palomine on vinyl to celebrate the album's 30th anniversary. In the Benelux, it was also reissued on CD by Bettie Serveert's own Palomine Records label, bundled with an eleven-song bonus disc titled The Palomine Demos that features demos recorded from 1991 to 1992. The reissue reached a new peak of number 30 in the Netherlands, while also reaching number 177 on the Belgian Flanders albums chart.

== Critical reception ==
Professional ratings
Review scores
Source	Rating
AllMusic	4.5/5 stars
CD Review	4/5 stars
Entertainment Weekly	A−
NME	6/10
PopMatters	8/10
Q	4/5 stars
Rolling Stone	4/5 stars
The Rolling Stone Album Guide	3.5/5 stars
Spin Alternative Record Guide	8/10
Uncut	8/10

Q reviewer Martin Aston commented that Palomine "is produced with a bar band intimacy that amplifies the sparse, roaming spaces at the heart of the music", and that "Carol van Dijk has a vibrant, husky voice, capable of plaintive, precocious passion and gutsy ferverishness". Stephanie Zacharek, writing for CD Review, said that as a vocalist, van Dijk "taps into" the subtleties of her "austere" lyrics and "brings home, in words, the sorts of things that are otherwise best communicated by a wry smile or the flutter of eyelashes." Spin's Jim Greer stated that the album juxtaposes "Van Dijk's suspiciously accurate Long Island-inflected langour with the slow, intense sloppiness of the band to form one glorious mess of sound", while also finding Bettie Serveert's songwriting remarkably mature for an indie rock band. In The New York Times, Jon Pareles wrote that the band's songs "echo the clear-cut melodies and verbal directness of Neil Young and the garage-rock scruffiness of his collegiate-rock heirs, like Dinosaur Jr."

Palomine placed at number 15 in The Village Voice's 1993 year-end Pazz & Jop critics' poll. Robert Christgau, the poll's creator, awarded it a "two-star honorable mention" and remarked, "by the time the tunes grow on you, you'll be wondering why the songs never get where they're going".

== Track listing ==
All lyrics are written by Carol van Dijk, except where noted; all music is composed by Bettie Serveert (Herman Bunskoeke, Van Dijk, Berend Dubbe, and Peter Visser), except where noted.

No.	Title	Length
1.	"Leg"	6:11
2.	"Palomine"	4:09
3.	"Kid's Allright"	4:20
4.	"Brain-Tag"	6:26
5.	"Tom Boy"	4:21
6.	"Under the Surface"	4:17
7.	"Balentine"	4:11
8.	"This Thing Nowhere"	3:18
9.	"Healthy Sick" (lyrics and music by Lou Barlow)	2:23
10.	"Sundazed to the Core"	7:05
11.	"Palomine (Small)"	2:31
Total length:		49:12

Notes

- "Brain-Tag" is omitted from the LP edition of the album. The UK LP edition, released by Guernica, instead included a bonus 7" disc featuring "Brain-Tag" on side one and "Get the Bird" and "Smile" on side two.

30th anniversary CD reissue bonus tracks
No.	Title	Length
12.	"Smile"	3:42
13.	"Maggot"	2:40
14.	"Get the Bird"	3:22
Total length:		58:56

30th anniversary CD reissue bonus disc – The Palomine Demos
No.	Title	Length
1.	"Leg" (demo Jan '92)	5:43
2.	"The Kid's Allright" (demo Jan '92)	4:30
3.	"Tom Boy" (demo Jan '92)	3:24
4.	"Totally Freaked Out" (demo Jan '92)	3:55
5.	"Get the Bird" (demo Jan '92)	3:02
6.	"This Thing Nowhere" (demo Jan '92)	3:19
7.	"Maggot" (demo Jan '92)	2:42
8.	"Palomine (Small)" (Carol acoustic, summer '92)	2:10
9.	"Leg" (Carol acoustic, fall '91)	3:41
10.	"Balentine" (acoustic, summer '92)	4:17
11.	"Brain-Tag" (Carol acoustic, summer '92)	4:08
Total length:		40:51

== Personnel ==
Credits are adapted from the album's liner notes.

Bettie Serveert

- Herman Bunskoeke – bass
- Carol van Dijk – guitar, vocals
- Berend Dubbe – drums
- Peter Visser – guitar

Production

- Bettie Serveert – production
- Berend Dubbe – mixing
- Frans Hagenaars – production, mixing
- Edwin "Hank" Heath – production, mixing
- The Masters – mastering

Design

- Diederik van der Donk – photography
- Roel Siebrand – cover design

== Charts ==
Chart (1992–1993)	Peak position
Dutch Albums (Album Top 100)	43
Dutch Alternative Albums (Dutch Charts)	2

Chart (2023)	Peak position
Belgian Albums (Ultratop Flanders)	177
Dutch Albums (Album Top 100)	30
