= Damaged Good =

Studio album by Bettie Serveert
- Released: 2016
- Genre: Indie rock
- Length: 38:03
- Label: Palomine Records

Bettie Serveert chronology
Oh, Mayhem! (2013)	Damaged Good (2016)

Singles from Damaged Good
- 1. "Never Be Over (feat. Prof. Nomad & Co)" Released: 2016; 2. "Love Sick (featuring Peter te Bos)" Released: 2016; 3. "Brother (in Loins)" Released: 2017; 4. "Unsane" Released: 2017; 5. "B-Cuz" Released: 2017

Damaged Good is the tenth studio album by Dutch indie rock band Bettie Serveert, released in 2016 on Palomine Records. The CD was released on October 28, 2016, and the LP was released on November 4 of that year.

Professional ratings
Review scores
Source	Rating
AllMusic	4/5 stars
Rockerzine	(favorable)

== Track listing ==
1. "B-Cuz" – 2:56
2. "Brickwall" – 1:09
3. "Brother (in Loins)" – 3:56
4. "Damaged Good" – 3:06
5. "Whatever Happens" – 4:42
6. "Unsane" – 3:09
7. "Digital Sin (Nr 7)" – 7:47
8. "Mouth of Age" – 0:44
9. "Love Sick" (feat. Peter te Bos) – 2:46
10. "Mrs. K" – 3:32
11. "Never Be Over" (feat. Prof. Nomad & Co) – 3:55

== Personnel ==
- Carol Van Dyk – vocals, guitar
- Peter Visser – guitar
- Herman Bunskoeke – bass guitar
- Joppe Molenaar – drums
- Jesse Beuker – keys on Brother (in Loins), Whatever Happens, Unsane, Love Sick
- Peter te Bos – vocals on Love Sick
