= Bare Stripped Naked =

Studio album by Bettie Serveert
- Released: 2006
- Genre: Indie rock
- Length: 42:44
- Label: Palomine Records

Bettie Serveert chronology
Attagirl (2005)	Bare Stripped Naked (2006)	Pharmacy of Love (2010)

Singles from Bare Stripped Naked
- 1. "Roadmovies" Released: 2005

Bare Stripped Naked is the seventh studio album by Dutch indie rock band Bettie Serveert.

Professional ratings
Review scores
Source	Rating
AllMusic	4/5 stars
CMJ New Music Monthly	(mixed)
Exclaim!	(favorable)
Mother Jones	(favorable)
PopMatters	6/10 stars

== Track listing ==
1. "Roadmovies" – 4:34
2. "Hell = Other People" – 3:38
3. "Love & Learn" – 2:34
4. "Brain-tag" – 3:03
5. "Storm" – 3:18
6. "The Rope" – 3:17
7. "All The Other Fish" – 3:29
8. "What They Call Love" – 3:12
9. "Painted Word" – 2:18
10. "2nd Time" – 3:37
11. "Hell = Other People" (alternative version) – 3:51
12. "Certainlie" – 5:49

== Personnel ==
- Carol Van Dyk – vocals, guitar
- Peter Visser – guitar
- Herman Bunskoeke – bass guitar
- Martijn Blankestijn – keyboards
- Gino Geudens – drums, vocals
- Henk Jonkers – drums "Storm"
- René van Barneveld – electric guitar "Roadmovies"
- Yvonne v.d. Pol – strings "All the Other Fish"

== Bonus DVD ==
The album is released with a bonus DVD, containing a concert in Brussels.
