= Primo (Rifle Sport album) =

Studio album by Rifle Sport
- Released: 1991
- Recorded: May 1990
- Label: Ruthless
- Producer: Iain Burgess

Rifle Sport chronology
Live At The Entry, Dead At The Exit (1989)	Primo (1991)

Professional ratings
Review scores
Source	Rating
Martin C. Strong	4/10

Primo is an album by the American band Rifle Sport. It was released in 1991 on Ruthless Records.

== Critical reception ==
The Washington Post wrote: "The Twin Cities foursome ... sometimes produce Chicago-style death-rattle, but also skirt the borders of pop; the guitar lead on 'Jobs,' for example, is actually melodic, and 'Kings and I' includes a quiet interlude. Primo is hardly that, but it's a consistent, cohesive record from a band that has mastered, if not transcended, the form."

== Track listing ==
1. "Exploding Man"
2. "Jobs"
3. "Black Shadow"
4. "Manfred"
5. "Positions"
6. "Clouds"
7. "24 Doors"
8. "Sun in the Sky"
9. "Kings and I"
10. "Jon"

== Personnel ==
- J. Christopher – vocals
- Gerard-Jean Boissy – guitar
- Flour – bass guitar
- Todd Trainer – drums
- Scott G. Kottke – artwork
