= Harder/Fuller Films =

Harder/Fuller Films, Inc. was a film and video production house based in Minneapolis, Minnesota from 1985 to 2005.

Run by founders (director) Phil Harder and (producer) Rick Fuller, the firm concentrated mainly on artistic work, such as music videos, and also commercial advertising.

Their high-quality products in the field earned them many awards, as well as the respect from their peers in the film and video industry.

== Works ==
Harder/Fuller Films are known for their creative and groundbreaking approach.

They have produced music videos for Prince, Barenaked Ladies, Matchbox Twenty, Liz Phair, Low, Incubus, Foo Fighters, to name just a few.
