= Dust Bunnies =

Studio album by Bettie Serveert
- Released: 1997
- Studio: Bearsville
- Genre: Folk-pop
- Length: 41:19
- Label: Beggars Banquet (BBQCD 189)
- Producer: Bryce Goggin

Bettie Serveert chronology
Lamprey (1995)	Dust Bunnies (1997)	Plays Venus in Furs and Other Velvet Underground Songs (2000)

Singles from Dust Bunnies
- 1. "Co-coward" Released: 1997; 2. "Rudder" Released: 1997; 3. "What Friends?" Released: 1997

Professional ratings
Review scores
Source	Rating
AllMusic	3.5/5 stars
The A.V. Club	favorable
Chicago Tribune	2/5 stars
Christgau's Consumer Guide	(2-star Honorable Mention)
Entertainment Weekly	B
People	positive
Spin	8/10
NME	6/10

Dust Bunnies is the third album by the Dutch indie band Bettie Serveert, released in 1997.

== Track listing ==
1. "Geek" – 3:52
2. "The Link" – 3:09
3. "Musher" – 3:09
4. "Dust Bunny" – 2:12
5. "What Friends?" – 2:47
6. "Misery Galore" – 4:02
7. "Story in a Nutshell" – 1:10
8. "Sugar the Pill" – 4:00
9. "Rudder" – 2:45
10. "Pork & Beans" – 2:58
11. "Fallen Foster" – 3:57
12. "Co-coward" – 3:47
13. "Heaven" – 3:31

== Personnel ==
- Herman Bunskoeke – bass
- Berend Dubbe – drums
- Bryce Goggin – producer, mixing
- Scott Hull – mastering
- Carol van Dijk – guitar, vocals
- Peter Visser – guitar
- David Voigt – engineer
