= Unwell =

2003 single by Matchbox Twenty

Single by Matchbox Twenty

from the album More Than You Think You Are
- Released: February 3, 2003
- Studio: Bearsville (Bearsville, New York); The Hit Factory (New York City)
- Length: 3:48
- Label: Atlantic
- Songwriter: Rob Thomas
- Producer: Matt Serletic

Matchbox Twenty singles chronology
"Disease" (2002)	"Unwell" (2003)	"Bright Lights" (2003)

Music video
- "Unwell" on YouTube

"Unwell" is a song by American alternative rock group Matchbox Twenty. Released on February 3, 2003, as the second single from their third album, More Than You Think You Are (2002), it was written by Matchbox Twenty lead singer Rob Thomas. "Unwell" spent 18 weeks atop the US Billboard Adult Top 40 chart and two weeks atop the Billboard Adult Contemporary chart. It also reached No. 5 on the Billboard Hot 100, becoming their third and final top-10 hit. Internationally, the single became a top-20 hit in Australia, peaking at No. 12, and a top-10 hit in New Zealand, peaking at No. 8. "Unwell" was nominated for a Grammy Award in 2004 for Best Pop Performance by a Duo or Group with Vocal.

== Content ==
On the live DVD Show: A Night in the Life of Matchbox Twenty, lead singer Rob Thomas states that he wrote the song as a metaphor for humanity in general, a song for people who are "messed up and feel alone like that. We all feel a little messed up sometimes... you're not alone."

== Reception ==
The song was the second most-played song in the United States in 2003 according to Billboard magazine. The music video was No. 1 on VH1's Top 40 Videos of 2003. In 2011, VH1 named the song as the 82nd best song of the 2000s.

== Music video ==
Directed by Meiert Avis, the music video predominantly features Thomas seeing various odd occurrences throughout, all the while singing along to the song. The other band members only appear in cameos, notably when Thomas boards a subway and they are seen in the background. The appearance of the other bandmates is also altered like most of the video (their noses are rather large). The other band members are also seen at the end of the video gathered in Thomas' room, and each takes their turn waving goodbye to the camera before Thomas does so as well at the end of the video. One of the reasons Thomas picked Avis to direct is because his concept for the video was the closest thing to an acid trip out of every other idea.

== Track listing ==
German and Australian CD single

1. "Unwell" (Avid Rough Cut 1) – 3:55
2. "All I Need" (live) – 3:41
3. "Unwell" (live acoustic) – 4:12

== Credits and personnel ==
Credits are taken from the More Than You Think You Are album booklet.

Studios

- Recorded at Bearsville Studios (Bearsville, New York) and The Hit Factory (New York City)
- Mixed at The Hit Factory (New York City)
- Mastered at Marcussen Mastering (Hollywood, California)

Personnel

- Rob Thomas – writing, vocals
- Kyle Cook – background vocals, lead guitar
- Adam Gaynor – background vocals, rhythm guitar
- Brian Yale – bass
- Paul Doucette – drums, percussion
- Matt Serletic – keyboards, production
- Erik Ralske – French horn
- Jerome Ashby – French horn
- Greg Collins – recording, additional mixing
- Jim Scott – mixing
- Chris Testa – mixing assistance
- Mark Dodson – Pro Tools, digital editing, additional engineering
- Pat Woodward – additional engineering
- Stephen Marcussen – mastering
- Stewart Whitmore – mastering

== Charts ==
=== Weekly charts ===
Chart (2003–2004)	Peak position
Australia (ARIA)	12
Canada CHR (Nielsen BDS)	10
New Zealand (Recorded Music NZ)	8
Romania (Romanian Top 100)	100
UK Singles (Official Charts)	83
US Billboard Hot 100	5
US Adult Alternative Airplay (Billboard)	17
US Adult Contemporary (Billboard)	1
US Adult Pop Airplay (Billboard)	1
US Pop Airplay (Billboard)	3

=== Year-end charts ===
Chart (2003)	Position
Australia (ARIA)	65
Brazil (Crowley)	33
New Zealand (RIANZ)	8
US Billboard Hot 100	6
US Adult Top 40 (Billboard)	1
US Adult Contemporary (Billboard)	11
US Mainstream Top 40 (Billboard)	6

Chart (2004)	Position
US Adult Contemporary (Billboard)	8
US Adult Top 40 (Billboard)	35

=== Decade-end charts ===
Chart (2000–2009)	Position
US Billboard Hot 100	67

== Certifications ==
Region	Certification	Certified units/sales
Australia (ARIA)	3× Platinum	210,000^{‡}
New Zealand (RMNZ)	2× Platinum	60,000^{‡}
United States (RIAA)	4× Platinum	4,000,000^{‡}
^{‡} Sales+streaming figures based on certification alone.

== Release history ==
Region	Date	Format(s)	Label(s)	Ref.
United States	February 3, 2003	Contemporary hit; hot AC; triple A radio	Atlantic	
Australia	April 21, 2003	CD	Atlantic	

== See also ==
- List of Billboard Adult Contemporary number ones of 2003
- Used to Be, a 2021 single by American DJ Steve Aoki, American singer Kiiara, and featuring American rapper Wiz Khalifa, which interpolates the chorus lyrics for its own chorus
