= Plays Venus in Furs and Other Velvet Underground Songs =

Plays Venus in Furs and other Velvet Underground songs

Live album by Bettie Serveert
- Released: 1998
- Recorded: 27 November 1997
- Venue: Paradiso, Amsterdam, the Netherlands
- Genre: Pop rock
- Length: 52:00
- Label: Brinkman Records

Bettie Serveert chronology
| Dust Bunnies (1997) | Plays Venus in Furs and other Velvet Underground songs (1998) | Private Suit (2000) |

Singles from Plays Venus in Furs and Other Velvet Underground Songs
- 1. "Beginning to See the Light" Released: 2019

Bettie Serveert plays Venus in Furs and other Velvet Underground songs is a live album by the Dutch indie rock band Bettie Serveert, released in 1998. The songs are all Velvet Underground covers, recorded during a concert at the Paradiso, in Amsterdam, in 1997.

The album was a limited release and quickly sold out and was out of print until 2019 when the album, along with four bonus tracks, was reissued and remastered for a digital-only release on 27 November 2019. The release date marked exactly 22 years after their last Paradiso show. A music video for "Beginning to See the Light" was released to promote the reissue. The music video featured footage of the Super 8 movies that were projected during the band's live show.

Professional ratings
Review scores
| Source | Rating |
|---|---|
| AllMusic | 2.5/5 stars |
| Melody Maker | 4/5 stars |

== Track listing ==
All tracks are written by Lou Reed except where noted.

Plays Venus in Furs and Other Velvet Underground Songs
| No. | Title | Length |
|---|---|---|
| 1. | "Beginning to See the Light" | 5:30 |
| 2. | "Stephanie Says" | 3:20 |
| 3. | "What Goes On" | 3:59 |
| 4. | "Venus in Furs" | 6:18 |
| 5. | "Sunday Morning" (Reed/John Cale) | 3:21 |
| 6. | "The Black Angel's Death Song" (Reed/Cale) | 5:40 |
| 7. | "I Can't Stand It" | 3:59 |
| 8. | "European Son" (Reed/Cale/Sterling Morrison/Moe Tucker) | 8:45 |
| 9. | "Rock & Roll" | 8:08 |
| 10. | "After Hours" | 2:57 |

Bonus Tracks (2019 reissue)
| No. | Title | Length |
|---|---|---|
| 11. | "Here She Comes Now" (Reed/Cale/Morrison/Tucker) | 4:02 |
| 12. | "Guess I'm Falling in Love" (Reed/Cale/Morrison/Tucker) | 4:28 |
| 13. | "Run Run Run" | 3:24 |
| 14. | "There She Goes Again" | 2:54 |

== Personnel ==
- Carol van Dijk – vocals, guitar
- Herman Bunskoeke – bass, vocals
- Peter Visser – guitar, vocals, xylophone, violin
- Berend Dubbe – drums, vocals, tapes, guitar
