= Private Suit =

Studio album by Bettie Serveert
- Released: 5 September 2000
- Recorded: Weesp, Netherlands
- Genre: Indie rock, pop rock
- Length: 45:38
- Label: Parasol Records
- Producer: John Parish

Bettie Serveert chronology
Plays Venus in Furs and Other Velvet Underground Songs (1998)	Private Suit (2000)	Log 22 (2003)

Singles from Private Suit
- 1. "White Tales" Released: 2000; 2. "Private Suit" Released: 2000

Private Suit is the fourth studio album by Dutch indie rock band Bettie Serveert, and their first to be released on Parasol Records. It was released on 5 September 2000 through Parasol's subsidiary Hidden Agenda Records. It received generally favorable reviews from critics, with a score of 80 out of 100 on the critic review aggregator site Metacritic. One critic who did not like the album was Keith Harris, who wrote in the Chicago Reader that he thought the album "sounded false".

Professional ratings
Aggregate scores
Source	Rating
Metacritic	(80%)
Review scores
Source	Rating
AllMusic	4/5 stars
Austin Chronicle	2.5/4 stars
Entertainment Weekly	C+
Pitchfork	4.9/10
PopMatters	favorable
The New Rolling Stone Album Guide	3.5/5 stars
Village Voice	A–
Wall of Sound	91/100

== Track listing ==
Music by Bettie Serveert, lyrics by Carol van Dyk, except track 9.

1. "Unsound" – 4:32
2. "Satisfied" – 3:41
3. "Private Suit" – 4:32
4. "Mariachi Souls" – 3:19
5. "Recall" – 5:18
6. "Auf Wiedersehen" – 3:52
7. "Sower & Seeds" – 4:35
8. "White Tales" – 4:20
9. "John Darmy" – 3:10 (music by De Artsen, lyrics by Joost Visser and Carol van Dyk)
10. "My Fallen Words" – 2:47
11. "Healer" – 4:49

== Personnel ==
Bettie Serveert

- Carol van Dyk – vocal (all tracks), guitar (1, 3–8, 10, 11), marimba (2), piano (2, 4), hammond (11)
- Peter Visser – guitar (1–3, 5–9, 11), synthesizer (1, 2, 5), backing vocal (1), organ (2, 9), marimba (2, 11), piano (5, 8, 10), vibraphone (11)
- Herman Bunskoeke – bass (1–3, 5–11), backing vocal (1), keyboard (2, 8), piano (11)
- Reinier Veldman – drums (1–3, 5–11), octopad (2, 5, 11)

Additional personnel

- Buni Lenski – violin (2, 3, 10)
- Simon Lenski – cello (2, 3, 10)
- Pascal Deweze – piano (6), backing vocal (6, 8)
- Allan Muller – backing vocal (6), synthesizer (8)
- Bart Vincent – backing vocal (7, 9)
- John Parish – organ (1), tambourine (1, 9, 11), rhodes (2, 9), congas (2, 11), dobro (4), hammond (7), piano (8), marimba (11), producer, mixing, mastering
- Sytze Gardenier – engineer
