= These Hard Times =

Single by Matchbox Twenty

from the album Exile on Mainstream
- Released: January 29, 2008
- Recorded: 2007
- Genre: Alternative rock; pop rock
- Length: 3:48 (album version); 3:26 (radio edit)
- Label: Atlantic
- Songwriters: Rob Thomas; Paul Doucette; Kyle Cook; Brian Yale
- Producer: Steve Lillywhite

Matchbox Twenty singles chronology
"All Your Reasons" (2008)	"These Hard Times" (2008)	"She's So Mean" (2012)

"These Hard Times" is the second single (worldwide except Australia) from rock band Matchbox Twenty's first compilation album Exile on Mainstream (2007).

It was released as a follow-up to "All Your Reasons", which was released only in Australia, and although not an official single in Australia, "These Hard Times" was serviced to radio there; it did not gain much airplay.

== Music video ==
The video features the band playing in the street in front of what appears to be a warehouse. Many people pass by as if nothing is happening. Near the end of the song, several colored balloons come out of a gutter and the warehouse's doors open, letting more and more balloons out. All the people seen in the video stop and look upwards to the balloons. The video ends when the band stops playing and stares at the balloons as well.

The video was directed by Ramon & Pedro.

== Track listing ==
1. "These Hard Times" (album version)
2. "Bright Lights" (Live from Wal-Mart Soundcheck)

EP version

1. "These Hard Times" – 3:48
2. "3 AM" (live soundcheck version) – 3:51
3. "Bright Lights" (live soundcheck version) – 4:38

== Personnel ==
- Rob Thomas – lead vocals, melodica
- Kyle Cook – electric guitar, backing vocals, glockenspiel
- Paul Doucette – acoustic guitar, piano, backing vocals, Casio guitar
- Brian Yale – bass
- Ryan MacMillan – drums

== Charts ==
=== Weekly charts ===
Chart (2008)	Peak position
Canada Hot AC (Billboard)	45
US Bubbling Under Hot 100 (Billboard)	12
US Adult Contemporary (Billboard)	28
US Adult Pop Airplay (Billboard)	7
US Pop Airplay (Billboard)	40

=== Year-end charts ===
Chart (2008)	Position
US Adult Top 40	29

== Release history ==
Release dates and formats for "These Hard Times"
Region	Date	Format	Label(s)	Ref.
United States	January 29, 2008	Mainstream airplay	Atlantic	
