= Log 22 =

Studio album by Bettie Serveert
- Released: 2003
- Recorded: E-Sound Studios
- Genre: Indie rock
- Label: Palomine Records (PIASB 095)
- Producer: Peter Visser

Bettie Serveert chronology
Private Suit (2000)	Log 22 (2003)	Attagirl (2005)

Singles from Log 22
- 1. "Smack" Released: 2003; 2. "Wide Eyed Fools" Released: 2003

Professional ratings
Aggregate scores
Source	Rating
Metacritic	(72/100)
Review scores
Source	Rating
AllMusic	3.5/5 stars
Pitchfork	2.9/10
Rolling Stone	4/5 stars
The Village Voice	A−

Log 22 is the fifth studio album by the Dutch band Bettie Serveert, released in 2003.

== Critical reception ==
Log 22 received mixed to generally favorable reviews. PopMatters thought that the album worked best "when the band go all-out in their shameless worshipping of The Velvet Underground, and three of the album's lengthier tracks mark the album's finest moments." Exclaim! wrote that producer Peter Visser "seemingly includes every great idea they had during recording, and leaves listeners with the feeling they just ate an entire chocolate cake. It's increasingly cloying and claustrophobic, and too much to sustain for a full 60 minutes."

== Track listing ==
1. "Wide Eyed Fools" - 5:10
2. "Smack" - 2:10
3. "Have a Heart" - 4:35
4. "Captain of Maybe" - 4:35
5. "De Diva" - 6:10
6. "Given" - 6:10
7. "Not Coming Down" - 2:17
8. "Cut 'N' Dried" - 2:48
9. "Log 22" - 4:33
10. "White Dogs" - 8:20
11. "Certainlie" - 4:48
12. "The Ocean, My Floor" - 7:03
13. "The Love-in" - 2:33
