= Downfall (Matchbox Twenty song) =

2004 single by Matchbox Twenty

Single by Matchbox Twenty

from the album More Than You Think You Are
- Released: February 9, 2004
- Length: 4:07
- Label: Atlantic
- Songwriters: Matt Serletic, Rob Thomas
- Producer: Matt Serletic

Matchbox Twenty singles chronology
"Bright Lights" (2004)	"Downfall" (2004)	"All I Need" (2004)

"Downfall" is a song by American rock band Matchbox Twenty. The song was written by producer Matt Serletic and lead singer Rob Thomas. It was released in February 2004 as the fourth US single from their 2002 album, More Than You Think You Are, alongside "All I Need", which was released on the same day in Australia. "Downfall" reached number 27 on the US Billboard Adult Top 40 chart in mid-2004.

== Charts ==
Chart (2004)	Peak position
US Adult Pop Airplay (Billboard)	27
