= Lamprey (surname) =

Lamprey is a surname. Notable people with the surname include:

- Louise Lamprey (1869–1951), American author
- Zane Lamprey (born 1976), American comedian, actor, editor, producer, and writer
- Hugh Lamprey (1928–1996), British ecologist and bush pilot
- Teresa Lamprey, one of the directors of Brazilian soap opera Viver a Vida
