= Bettie Serveert =

Dutch rock band

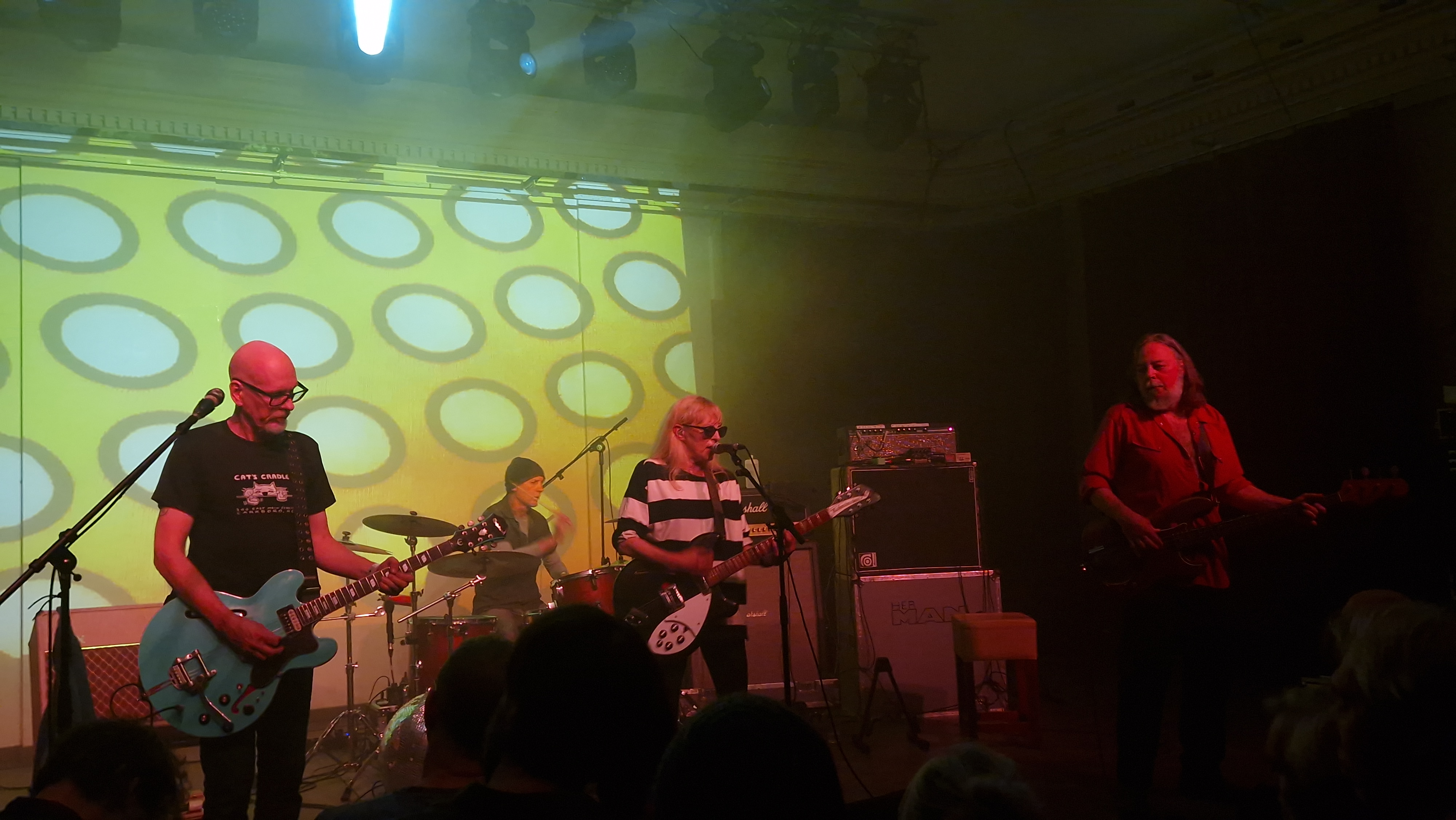
- Bettie Serveert performing in Belgium in 2026. From left: Peter Visser, Joppe Molenaar, Carol van Dijk, Herman Bunskoeke

Background information
- Origin: Amsterdam, Netherlands
- Genres: Indie rock Alternative rock
- Years active: 1990–present
- Labels: Matador; Beggars Banquet; Hidden Agenda; Minty Fresh; Second Motion Records
- Members: Carol van Dijk; Peter Visser; Herman Bunskoeke; Stephan Van Der Meijden
- Past members: Berend Dubbe; Reinier Veldman; Stoffel Verlackt; Jeroen Blankert; Herman Bunskoeke; Martijn Blankestijn; Gino Geudens
- Website: http://www.bettieserveert.com/

Bettie Serveert is a Dutch indie rock band. The name translates to "Bettie Serves", which is the title of a book written by Dutch tennis player Betty Stöve, who made it to the Wimbledon Ladies Singles final in 1977.

The band as of 2025 is composed of Carol Van Dijk (or "van Dyk", born 22 April 1962, in Vancouver, British Columbia) (vocals and guitar), Peter Visser (guitar) and Stephan Van Der Meijden (drums). The band originally formed in 1986, but its members split up for four years, following their first gig. They reformed in 1990, and released their debut album, Palomine, in 1992. According to The Guardian, the album was a "high point for European guitar music in an era dominated by the US and UK".

== History ==
In 1995, the group released their second album, Lamprey, which was well received by critics. They subsequently obtained tour slots alongside artists including Belly, Dinosaur Jr, Buffalo Tom, Superchunk, Come, and Jeff Buckley.

After releasing the full-length album Dust Bunnies in 1997, Bettie Serveert released a cover album featuring songs from the band Velvet Underground. Berend Dubbe left the band due to artistic differences and started his own band, Bauer.

In July 2001, Van Dijk and Pascal Deweze of Sukilove released their self-titled album as Chitlin' Fooks. They followed it with Did it Again in January 2003.

A number of drummers, such as Reinier Veldman (who played the drums in the Bettie Serveert proto-band De Artsen), stood in for Dubbe on their next album, Private Suit. Stoffel Verlackt, Jeroen Blankert, and Gino Geudens played the drums on Log 22 and Attagirl. Bettie Serveert continues to tour extensively through Western Europe, Canada, and the United States. Their cover of the Bright Eyes track "Lover I Don't Have to Love" was featured in episode 18 of season 3 of the FOX show The OC. Palomine's title track can be heard playing in the background during episode 4 of My So-Called Life. The band also covered Bob Dylan's "I'll Keep It with Mine" for the soundtrack of the 1996 indie film I Shot Andy Warhol.

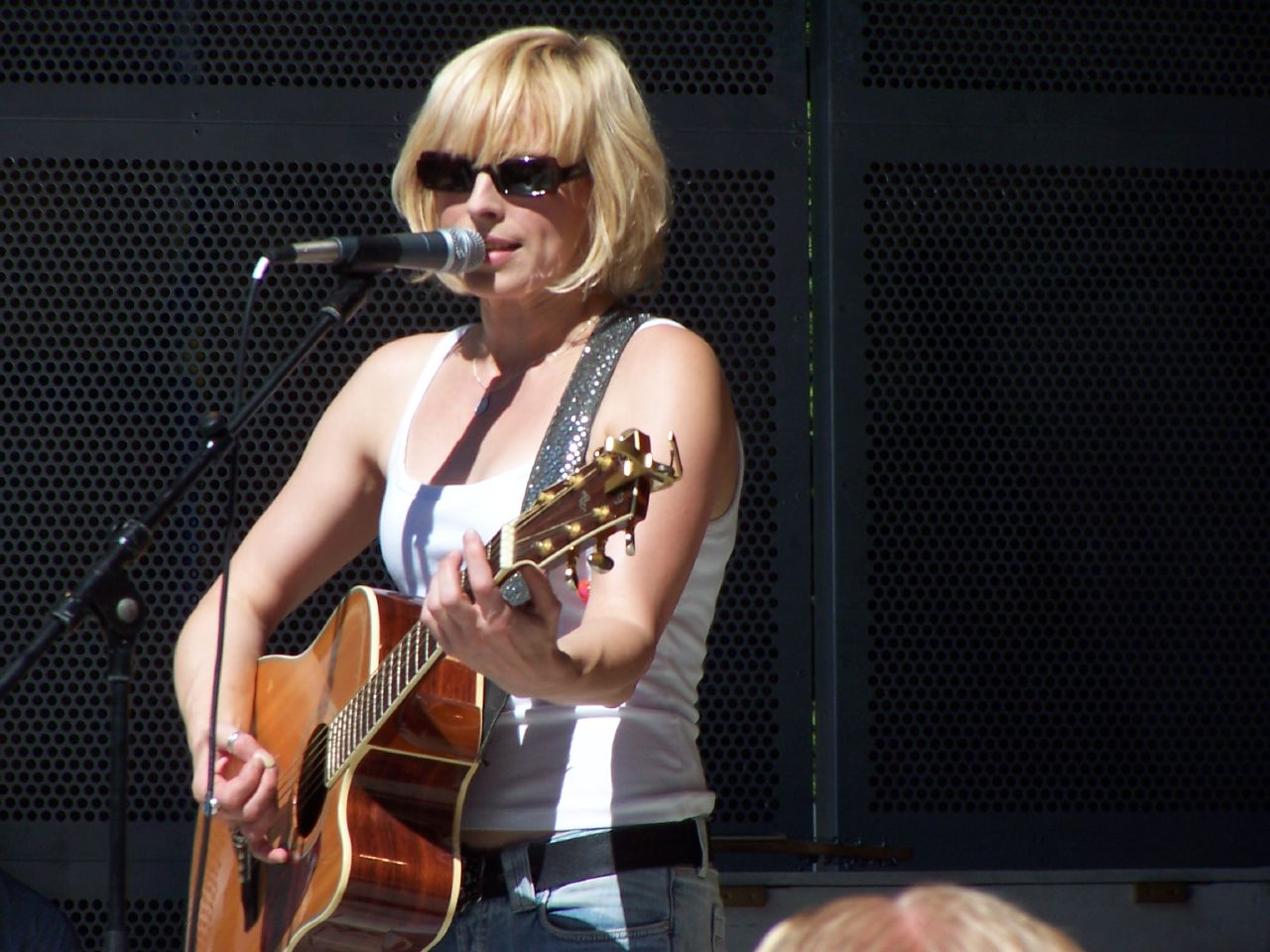
Carol van Dijk, lead singer of Bettie Serveert, performing in Vondelpark in 2006

Bettie Serveert released a digital only EP, Deny All, on Second Motion Records, on 26 January 2010 in the United States. Their ninth full-length album, Pharmacy of Love, was also given a US release by Second Motion on 23 March of that year.

2017 saw the release of Damaged Good, again to positive reception. A pink vinyl version with a gatefold cover, limited to 1,000 copies, was released as part of Record Store Day that year.

"Ta!", the group's first new song since 2017, was released as a single on 1 July 2025. A music video was also released.

== Carol van Dijk ==
Carol van Dijk was born in Canada to Dutch parents. Her native language is English. Her family moved to Holland in 1969, and van Dijk struggled with the subsequent language barrier, in particular the Amsterdam variation of the Dutch language. Her voice has been praised for its beauty and clarity, as well as its unusual pronunciations.

== Discography ==
=== Albums ===
- 1992: Palomine
- 1995: Lamprey
- 1997: Dust Bunnies
- 2000: Private Suit
- 2003: Log 22
- 2005: Attagirl
- 2006: Bare Stripped Naked
- 2010: Pharmacy of Love
- 2013: Oh, Mayhem!
- 2016: Damaged Good
- 2026: Beaucoup Bad

=== Singles/EPs ===
- 1992: "Tom Boy" (also on the soundtrack to Amateur)
- 1993: "Palomine"
- 1993: "Kids Alright"
- 1993: "Palomine" (new single edition)
- 1995: "Crutches"
- 1995: "Something So Wild"
- 1995: "Ray Ray Rain"
- 1997: "Co-coward"
- 1997: "Rudder"
- 1997: "What Friends?"
- 1999: Our New Demo (3 song EP)
- 2000: "White Tales"
- 2000: "Private Suit"
- 2003: "Smack"
- 2003: "Wide Eyed Fools"
- 2005: "Dreamaniacs"
- 2005: "You Changed"
- 2005: "Roadmovies"
- 2010: "Deny All"
- 2010: "The Pharmacy"
- 2013: "Shake-Her"
- 2013: "Monogamous"
- 2014: "Had2Byou"
- 2016: "Never Be Over" (featuring Prof. Nomad & Co.)
- 2016: "Love Sick" (featuring Peter te Bos)
- 2017: "Brother (in Loins)"
- 2017: "Unsane"
- 2017: "B-Cuz"
- 2017: "Say You Will" (featuring Prof. Nomad & Co.)
- 2019: "Beginning to See the Light" (Live)
- 2022: "For All We Know" (Acoustic '93)
- 2025: "Ta!"
- 2026: "Evil Side"
- 2026: "7 Shades"

=== Live ===
- 1998: Plays Venus in Furs and Other Velvet Underground Songs
- 2024: Live on 2 Meter Sessions

=== Other ===
- 1994: "For All We Know" from the Carpenters cover-song compilation album If I Were a Carpenter
- 1996: "I'll Keep It with Mine," a Bob Dylan cover from the I Shot Andy Warhol Soundtrack
