= Voice of Reason (Rifle Sport album) =

Studio album by Rifle Sport
- Released: 1983
- Recorded: 1982
- Genre: Post-punk
- Label: Reflex

Rifle Sport chronology
Voice of Reason (1983)	Complex EP (1985)

Voice Of Reason is the first album by the Minneapolis band Rifle Sport. It was released in 1983 by Bob Mould's Reflex Records.

== Critical reception ==
Maximum Rocknroll wrote: "The Gang of Four is the obvious reference point, but these guys add a more powerful and raw guitar sound to the funk rhythms, and occasionally break into more thrashy structures. The recording is excellent."

== Track listing ==
1. "Words of Reason"
2. "Angel Tears"
3. "Run & Hide"
4. "Danger Streets"
5. "Good News Week"
6. "Mind Over Matter"
7. "Hollow Men"
8. "Meet"
9. "Church"
10. "Keep On Walkin'"
11. "Correctional Facility"
12. "No Money"
13. "Eva Evita"

== Personnel ==
- J. Christopher – vocals
- Gerard-Jean Boissy – guitar
- Flour – bass guitar
- Jimmy Petroski – drums
