= The Magnolias (band) =

American indie rock band

- Origin: Minneapolis, Minnesota, U.S.
- Genres: Indie rock, alternative rock
- Years active: 1984-Current
- Labels: Twin/Tone Records, Alias Records, Veto Records, SMA Records
- Members: John Freeman; Mike Leonard; Pat McKenna; Rob Robello
- Past members: Tom Lischmann; John Joyce; Ron Anderson; Kyle Killorin; Tom Cook; John Devries; Sam Planet; Kent Militzer; Caleb Palmiter; Johnny O'Halloran; Dana Stewert; Dave Wiegardt; Eric Kassel, Dave Randall
- Website: The Magnolias on Facebook

The Magnolias are an American band from Minneapolis, fronted by John Freeman. They formed in 1984 and have had numerous lineup changes throughout their history, with Freeman being the only continuing member. They have released six albums, including their latest, Pop The Lock, in 2011.

== History ==
The Magnolias formed in 1984 in Minneapolis, fronted by singer/guitarist/songwriter John Freeman. They played their first gig in early 1985 and by the end of that decade they had released three albums on the local Minneapolis label Twin/Tone Records.

With a twin buzz-saw guitar and flexible rhythm section, John Freeman's caterwauling and songwriting, the band created a sound that was instantly identifiable. The Magnolias' high-energy American punk is compared favorably to the band's influences, including The Clash, The Only Ones, The Undertones, The Real Kids and Buzzcocks.

They signed to Alias Records and issued one LP, 1992's Off The Hook and an EP Hung Up On, featuring some tracks taken from Off The Hook. Another album, Street Date Tuesday, followed in 1996, with the band back on Twin/Tone.

The late 1990s and early 2000s saw a period of reduced activity for the band. In 2007, an album of unreleased demos and outtakes was issued, titled Better Late Than Never. They undertook their first European tour in 2008 and returned again in 2009 and 2025.

The band released a new album in 2011 titled Pop The Lock. it was funded thanks to Kickstarter.com, the online donation site. They continued to play sporadic gigs until New Year's Eve 2024 when they announced their disbanding.

== Discography ==
- Concrete Pillbox (1986) - Twin/Tone
- For Rent (1988) - Twin/Tone
- Dime Store Dream (1989) - Twin/Tone
- Off The Hook (1992) - Alias
- Hung Up On (1992) - Six track EP - Alias
- Street Date Tuesday (1996) - Twin/Tone
- Better Late Than Never (2007) - 13 unreleased demos
- Pop The Lock (2011) - Veto Records
