= Stick It! =

Studio album by Agitpop
- Released: 1990
- Recorded: April 1989
- Studio: Paisley Park
- Genre: Rock
- Label: Twin/Tone
- Producer: Albert Garzon

Agitpop chronology
Po-Town Tea Party (1989)	Stick It! (1990)	Agitpop (2007)

Stick It! is the fourth album by the American band Agitpop, released in 1990. The band supported it with a North American tour. "Stop, Drop, and Roll" and "Forget Me Not" were released as singles. The album was a success on college radio, with the first pressing selling out. Agitpop broke up shortly after the release of Stick It! and their tour.

== Production ==
Stick It! was recorded at Paisley Park, in Minnesota, in April 1989. The album release date was delayed by five months so that Agitpop could have Stick It! remastered; they hoped that the mix still reflected the band's harsh sound while highlighting the more conventional song structures. Dave Pirner contributed backing vocals to some of the songs. "Stop, Drop, and Roll" is about growing up during the Nuclear Age.

== Critical reception ==
Professional ratings
Review scores
Source	Rating
AllMusic	3/5 stars
The Philadelphia Inquirer	3/4 stars

The Philadelphia Inquirer said that Agitpop "deploys loud, thick guitar chords, elusive melodies and marvelously abstract, allusive lyrics to create an enjoyably messy, beguiling record." The Rocket opined that "the music jumps, stutters and grinds and the words are engrossing enough to make the lyric sheet worth deciphering." The Los Angeles Times noted the "percussive experimentation and social relevance".

The Atlanta Journal-Constitution called Stick It! "more accessible and agreeably roughshod than previous efforts", stating that "there's still lots of strum und drang clattering behind singer John DeVries's last-rasp of a voice." The State labeled the album "razor-edge rock with more relaxed pop sensibilities." Trouser Press dismissed it as "a monotonous landscape ... with precious few surprises, although 'Crack in Her Heart' is a spry mod nugget." Suburban Voice said that Agitpop was "cloying in their poppy rootsiness".

== Track listing ==
No.	Title	Length
1.	"Stop, Drop, and Roll"
2.	"Bill of Wrongs"
3.	"Outagain"
4.	"Crack in Her Heart"
5.	"A Madrigal from Hell"
6.	"Forget Me Not"
7.	"Recovery Road"
8.	"Up to Here with You"
9.	"Reading All About It"
10.	"Consequently"
11.	"On the Hudson (Salt Water)"
12.	"Bullet"
13.	"Adult Playpen"
