= Chitlin' Fooks =

Dutch pop musical duo

The Chitlin' Fooks were a duo consisting of Carol Van Dyk, the frontwoman of Dutch alternative rock band Bettie Serveert, and Pascal Deweze of Belgian pop group Sukilove. They released two albums, both on Hidden Agenda Records. The band they performed with consisted of four additional members: Guy Van Nueten (piano), Pieter van Buyten (bass), Stoffel Verlackt (drums), and Helder Deploige (multiple instruments). Their albums have been reviewed by PopMatters, Pitchfork Media, and Robert Christgau.

== Discography ==
- Chitlin' Fooks – 2001
- Did it Again – 2002
