= Rifle Sport =

American post punk band

- Origin: Minneapolis, Minnesota, United States
- Genres: Post-punk
- Years active: 1982–1995, 2004
- Labels: Reflex; Ruthless
- Past members: J. Christopher; Gerard Jean-Boissy; Peter Conway; Todd Trainer; Jimmy Petroski

Rifle Sport was an American post-punk band active in the 1980s and 1990s, from Minneapolis, Minnesota.

The band took its name from an arcade in downtown Minneapolis which was open in the 1940s to 1960s. An unrelated art gallery, Rifle Sport Gallery, also named after the arcade and housed in its old space, established their name after the band.

Drummer and vocalist Todd Trainer later formed Shellac with Steve Albini formerly of Big Black.

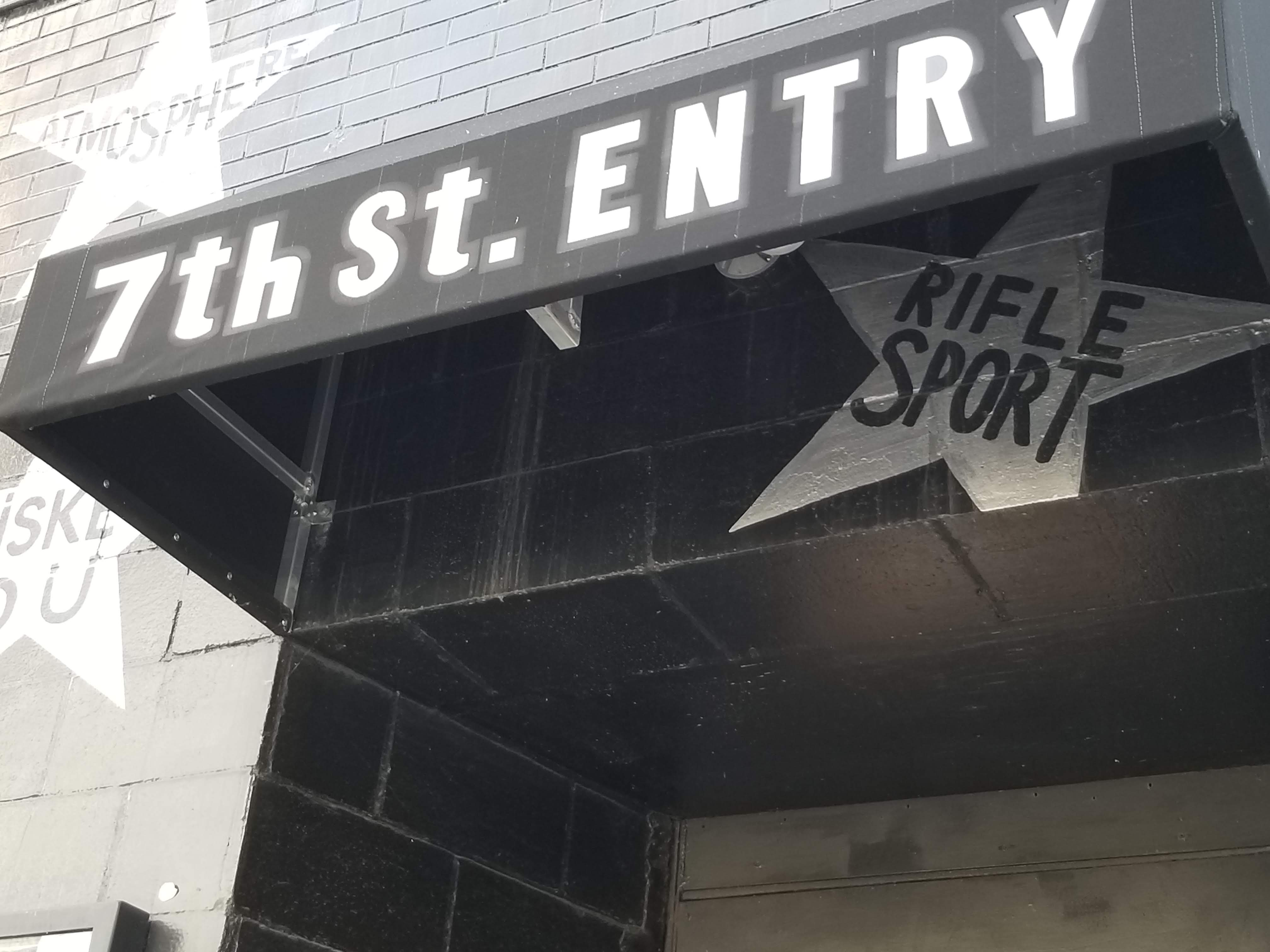
Star honoring Rifle Sport on the outside mural of the Minneapolis nightclub First Avenue

Rifle Sport was honored with a star on the outside mural of the Minneapolis nightclub First Avenue, recognizing performers that have played sold-out shows or have otherwise demonstrated a major contribution to the culture at the iconic venue. Receiving a star "might be the most prestigious public honor an artist can receive in Minneapolis," according to journalist Steve Marsh. Unlike most of the other stars on the mural, Rifle Sport's is hidden from view, underneath the awning of the door to the 7th Street Entry.

== Discography ==
=== Studio albums ===
- Voice of Reason (Reflex) (1983)
- White (Made in France) (Ruthless Records) (1987)
- Live at the Entry, Dead at the Exit (Ruthless) (1989)
- Primo (Big Money-Ruthless) (1991)

=== Singles and EPs ===
- "Plan 39/Dub" 7" (Ruthless) (1985)
- "Complex EP" (Ruthless) (1985)
- "Little Drummer Boy/Shanghaied" 7" (Big Money) (1991)

=== Compilations ===
- Barefoot & Pregnant CD v/a compilation (Reflex) (1998) - "Angel Tears", "No Money"
- Kitten: A Compilation v/a compilation (Reflex) (1999) - "Keep On Workin'", "Church"

== See also ==
- List of alternative rock artists
- Music of Minnesota
- Flour
- Breaking Circus
