= Fusebox Festival =

Fusebox Festival (now known as Fusebox Live) is a biennial festival of contemporary performance works (dance and theater) held in Austin, Texas, each spring. Founded in the mid-2000s, Fusebox is one of multiple interdisciplinary festivals that sprouted in the United States in the 2000s and was modeled on the Portland Time-Based Art Festival. In turn, Fusebox inspired other festivals, including the CounterCurrent Festival in Houston and Live Arts Exchange in Los Angeles. The festival is known for supporting local artists. It is part of an Austin city planning initiative to revitalize a 24-acre former airplane fueling facility into a creative district. Fusebox has grown from an original audience of 500 attendees in 2004 to 250,000 in its seventh festival, in 2011. In the mid-2010s, Fusebox made its shows free to attract a wider audience.

An Art in America review described the five-day 2019 show as provocative and challenging.

As of 2024, Fusebox has transitioned into a biennial model.
