= Agitpop =

American punk band

AGITPOP
- Origin: Poughkeepsie, New York, US
- Genres: Art punk, post punk, experimental rock
- Years active: 1981–1990; 2006–2007
- Labels: Comm3; Rough Trade; Twin Tone; 18 Acres
- Members: John deVries; Rick Crescini; Mark LaFalce

Agitpop is an art punk band from Poughkeepsie, New York. The band was formed in 1981 and began touring widely in 1983. They released four records on the Comm3, Twintone, and Rough Trade labels. Agitpop's popularity was established mainly by college radio stations, musicians, artists, and hardcore audiophiles.

== History ==
=== Origins ===
Bands that influenced Agitpop in regard to songwriting style, instrumentation, and delivery in performance have been noted to be Gang of Four, The Red Krayola, The Clash, Captain Beefheart, and Wire.

=== Breakup ===
Agitpop disbanded in 1990. They continued in various forms until just after the turn of the decade. The last official show is often stated as the reason for their disbanding. The band was scheduled to play a show at The Blue Note in Columbia, Missouri. On the previous day the bass player, Rick Crescini was diagnosed with tinnitus and was sent home for health reasons. Out of frustration with touring and due to band member conflicts, he stayed there. The band honored their contract with the Blue Note by playing that night, albeit with their road manager playing electric bass.

During the time that Agitpop was disbanded, deVries and LaFalce formed Cellophane. DeVries also formed a punk rock cover band The Mermaid Killers, and played with Grand Mal. DeVries died in January 2023.

=== Reunion ===
Agitpop regrouped in 2006 and released a new album in 2007 titled Agitpop.

==== Concert at Cabaret Voltaire ====
The first live performance after a pause of almost ten years took place at the Cabaret Voltaire in Zurich, Switzerland on July 13, 2007. The reunion show consisted of two very different sets. The first was titled "A Shotgun for a TV and an Eskimo Kiss," and consisted of a complete set of Agitpop songs. The equipment included guitars, an out-of-tune piano, and various instruments unusual in rock music (with no drum kit). All three members of Agitpop switched among the instruments. "God Bless America, Really?" was the title of the politically themed second set, which consisted of a medley of "noises in the ether" penned and sung by Agitpop's drummer Mark LaFalce.

== Musical style ==
The band was part of a pioneer movement in the underground music community and was particularly known for its unusual song styles, instrumentation, and lyrical content within the rock genre. The shows attracted celebrated members of the New York art scene including the Pop Art era photographer Billy Name.

The portmanteau Agitpop is derived from agitprop and is a conjugation of ‘agitation pop’, a now well-defined label that describes how popular music asserts political ideas and views. The band members were enamored with the idea and the origins of the word from the Russian Revolution and used the repetition and philosophy of it within pop culture.

Agitpop members have often described their approach to music as ‘a unique brand of fractured pop, derived from the dismantling of rock as we knew it.' The live shows were an extension of the philosophy the band was following. Agitpop's performances were very confrontational.

In a review from Trouser Press of one of the shows in the mid-1980s, Agitpop's unique stylistic approach to rock music was described with the phrase ‘Free your mind…and your ass will follow'.

== Members ==
- John deVries, vocals, guitars, clarinet, various toys & percussion
- Rick Crescini, electric bass, Glockenspiel, melodica
- Mark LaFalce, drums, percussion, guitars, and backup vocals

== Discography ==
=== LPs ===
- Feast of the Sunfish (Community 3 - 1985)
- Back at the Plain of Jars (Community 3/Rough Trade - 1986)
- Open Seasons (TwinTone - 1988)
- Stick It! (TwinTone - 1990)
- Agitpop (18 Acres - 2007)

=== EPs ===
- Po-Town Tea Party (TwinTone - 1989)

On several songs, additional players were featured on the albums.
