= More Than You Think You Are =

Studio album by Matchbox Twenty
- Released: November 19, 2002
- Recorded: June–October 2002
- Studios: Bearsville (Woodstock, New York); Hit Factory (New York City)
- Genres: Pop rock; alternative rock; post-grunge
- Length: 49:36
- Label: Atlantic
- Producer: Matt Serletic

Matchbox Twenty chronology
Mad Season (2000)	More Than You Think You Are (2002)	Exile on Mainstream (2007)

Singles from More Than You Think You Are
- 1. "Disease" Released: September 30, 2002; 2. "Unwell" Released: February 3, 2003; 3. "Bright Lights" Released: July 28, 2003; 4. "Downfall" Released: February 9, 2004; 5. "All I Need" Released: February 9, 2004

Professional ratings
Aggregate scores
Source	Rating
Metacritic	50/100
Review scores
Source	Rating
AllMusic	2.5/5 stars
Blender	2/5 stars
E!	C−
Los Angeles Times	2/4 stars
Mojo	2/5 stars
Now	2/5 stars
Q	2/5 stars
Rolling Stone	3/5 stars
Stylus	B
Uncut	2/5 stars

More Than You Think You Are is the third studio album by American rock band Matchbox Twenty, released on November 19, 2002. The album is again a departure for the band as it has more of a focus on harder rock than the band's two previous albums. Five singles were released from the album: "Disease", "Unwell", "Bright Lights", "Downfall", and "All I Need". "Downfall" was released only in the United States while "All I Need" was issued only in Australia.

== Recording ==
Produced by the band's longtime studio collaborator Matt Serletic, More Than You Think You Are was recorded at Bearsville Studios in Woodstock, New York and at The Hit Factory in New York City.

Rob Thomas was pleased with the album, saying: "This is probably the most rockin' record we've ever done, because we've been working with Greg Collins, who's engineered bands like System of a Down and Red Hot Chili Peppers, and mixer Jim Scott, who's worked with people like Wilco and Tom Petty & the Heartbreakers. But at the same time, there's a warmness to the record, a real organic quality that I just love."

== Release ==
The album debuted at number six on the Billboard 200 with 178,000 copies sold. Although not as commercially successful as the band's two earlier records, Yourself or Someone Like You and Mad Season, it had a large radio presence and produced three consecutive singles in the United States, all of them charting onto the top 30 of the Billboard Hot 100 chart. The album was nominated for Best Rock Album at the 2004 Grammy Awards, losing to the Foo Fighters' One by One. Following the album's release, the group took a hiatus to allow the members to focus on other projects, like Thomas's solo career. The following year, rhythm guitarist Adam Gaynor left the band in 2005.

== Track listing ==
All tracks are written by Rob Thomas, except where noted.

No.	Title	Writer(s)	Length
1.	"Feel"	Thomas; Kyle Cook; Paul Doucette	3:20
2.	"Disease"	Thomas; Mick Jagger	3:39
3.	"Bright Lights"		3:54
4.	"Unwell"		3:48
5.	"Cold"	Thomas; Matt Serletic	3:15
6.	"All I Need"		3:41
7.	"Hand Me Down"		5:02
8.	"Could I Be You"	Doucette	3:43
9.	"Downfall"	Thomas; Serletic	4:07
10.	"Soul"	Thomas; Cook; Doucette	4:34
11.	"You're So Real"		3:01
12.	"The Difference"		4:11
13.	"So Sad So Lonely" (hidden track)		3:46
Total length:			49:36

Deluxe edition bonus tracks
No.	Title	Writer(s)	Length
14.	"Tired"	Thomas; Brian Yale; John Leslie Goff; John Joseph Stanley	3:01
15.	"Don't Let Me Down" (Live from Australia)	Lennon–McCartney	4:11
16.	"Disease" (Acoustic)	Thomas; Jagger	3:46

== Personnel ==
Matchbox Twenty

- Rob Thomas – lead vocals, piano on "Bright Lights"
- Kyle Cook – lead guitar, backing vocals, piano on "Hand Me Down", banjo on "Unwell"
- Adam Gaynor – rhythm guitar, backing vocals
- Brian Yale – bass guitar
- Paul Doucette – drums and percussion on all tracks, Mellotron on "Hand Me Down" and "You're So Real", additional synthesizer on "All I Need", acoustic and electric guitar, piano and clavinet on "Could I Be You?"

Additional musicians

- Matt Serletic – production, keyboards, congas on "Cold", backing vocals on "Soul"
- David Campbell – string arrangements on "Bright Lights"
- Greg Leisz – pedal steel guitar on "Bright Lights" and "Hand Me Down"
- Bill Draheim – backing vocals on "Soul"
- Melonie Daniels and Cheryl Pepsii Riley – backing vocals on "Feel"
- Vaneese Thomas and Lydia Mann-Jaime – backing vocals on "Disease"
- Erik Ralske and Jerome Ashby – French horns on "Unwell"
- Carol Webb – violin and concert master on "Disease"
- Rudy Michel – gospel choir contractor for "Downfall"
- Jan Smith – vocal coach

== Charts ==
=== Weekly charts ===
Weekly chart performance for More Than You Think You Are
Chart (2002–2004)	Peak position
Australian Albums (ARIA)	3
Austrian Albums (Ö3 Austria)	40
Canadian Albums (Billboard)	10
Dutch Albums (Album Top 100)	71
German Albums (Offizielle Top 100)	11
Irish Albums (IRMA)	15
New Zealand Albums (RMNZ)	6
Norwegian Albums (VG-lista)	16
Scottish Albums (Official Charts)	17
Swiss Albums (Schweizer Hitparade)	61
Swedish Albums (Sverigetopplistan)	36
UK Albums (Official Charts)	31
US Billboard 200	6

=== Year-end charts ===
2002 year-end chart performance for More Than You Think You Are
Chart (2002)	Position
Canadian Albums (Nielsen SoundScan)	120
Canadian Alternative Albums (Nielsen SoundScan)	36

2003 year-end chart performance for More Than You Think You Are
Chart (2003)	Position
Australian Albums (ARIA)	8
New Zealand Albums (RMNZ)	27
US Billboard 200	27

2004 year-end chart performance for More Than You Think You Are
Chart (2004)	Position
Australian Albums (ARIA)	40
US Billboard 200	170

=== Decade-end chart ===
Decade-end chart performance for More Than You Think You Are
Chart (2000–2009)	Position
Australian Albums (ARIA)	48

== Certifications ==
Certifications for More Than You Think You Are
Region	Certification	Certified units/sales
Australia (ARIA)	5× Platinum	350,000^{^}
Canada (Music Canada)	Platinum	100,000^{^}
New Zealand (RMNZ)	Gold	7,500^{^}
United Kingdom (BPI)	Silver	60,000^{‡}
United States (RIAA)	2× Platinum	2,000,000^{^}
^{^} Shipments figures based on certification alone.^{‡} Sales+streaming figures based on certification alone.
