= Attagirl (album) =

Studio album by Bettie Serveert
- Released: 2005
- Studio: E-Sound Studios
- Label: Minty Fresh Records
- Producer: Peter Visser

Bettie Serveert chronology
Log 22 (2003)	Attagirl (2005)	Bare Stripped Naked (2006)

Singles from Attagirl
- 1. "Dreamaniacs" Released: 2005; 2. "You Changed" Released: 2003

Professional ratings
Review scores
Source	Rating
AllMusic	4/5 stars
Pitchfork	4.0/10
PopMatters	4/10 stars
Robert Christgau	B+

Attagirl is the sixth studio album by the Dutch band Bettie Serveert, released on 25 January 2005.

== Track listing ==
All tracks by Carol van Dijk and Peter Visser except where noted.

1. "Dreamaniacs" – 3:50
2. "Attagirl" – 3:53
3. "Don't Touch That Dial!" – 3:37
4. "Greyhound Song" – 3:21
5. "You've Changed" – 4:33
6. "Versace" – 5:16
7. "1 Off Deal" – 2:35
8. "Hands Off" – 3:35
9. "Staying Kind" – 4:40
10. "Lover I Don't Have to Love" (Bright Eyes) – 5:48
11. "Dreamaniacs" (acoustic) – 3:40
12. "Attagirl" (acoustic) – 3:54
