= Lamprey (album) =

Studio album by Bettie Serveert
- Released: January 24, 1995
- Recorded: Studio 150 (Amsterdam), Air Studios (London), Kingsway Studios (New Orleans)
- Genre: Indie pop
- Length: 49:22
- Label: Brinkman Records (BRCD 031)
- Producer: Frans Hagenaars

Bettie Serveert chronology
Palomine (1992)	Lamprey (1995)	Dust Bunnies (1997)

Singles from Lamprey
- 1. "Crutches" Released: 1995; 2. "Something Wild" Released: 1995; 3. "Ray Ray Rain" Released: 1995

Professional ratings
Review scores
Source	Rating
AllMusic	4/5 stars
Chicago Tribune	2/4 stars
Christgau's Consumer Guide	(neither)
Entertainment Weekly	B
Los Angeles Times	2.5/4 stars
Spin	0.5/1 star

Lamprey is the second album by the Dutch indie band Bettie Serveert, released in 1995.

== Track listing ==
1. "Keepsake" – 6:18
2. "Ray Ray Rain" – 4:22
3. "D. Feathers" – 5:32
4. "Re-feel-it" – 3:58
5. "21 Days" – 3:23
6. "Cybor *D" – 4:01
7. "Tell Me, Sad" – 5:18
8. "Crutches" – 4:52
9. "Something so Wild" – 2:51
10. "Totally Freaked Out" – 4:10
11. "Silent Spring" – 4:32

== Personnel ==
- Herman Bunskoeke – bass
- Peter Visser – guitar
- Carol van Dijk – guitar, vocals
- Berend Dubbe – drums
