= All I Need (Matchbox Twenty song) =

2004 single by Matchbox Twenty

Single by Matchbox Twenty

from the album More Than You Think You Are
- B-side: "Push" (live); "If You're Gone" (acoustic)
- Released: February 9, 2004
- Length: 3:41
- Label: Atlantic
- Songwriter: Rob Thomas
- Producer: Matt Serletic

Matchbox Twenty singles chronology
"Downfall" (2004)	"All I Need" (2004)	"How Far We've Come" (2007)

"All I Need" is a song by American rock band Matchbox Twenty from their third studio album, More Than You Think You Are (2002). Written by lead singer Rob Thomas, the song was released on February 9, 2004, in Australia as the fourth and final single from the album; in the United States, "Downfall"—released on the same day—served as the fourth and final single instead. This was Matchbox Twenty's last single until 2007 as well as the band's final single with rhythm guitarist Adam Gaynor as a member. The song charted at number 32 on the Australian ARIA Singles Chart.

== Track listing ==
Australian CD single

1. "All I Need"
2. "Push" (live from the Hard Rock Cafe)
3. "If You're Gone" (acoustic)

== Charts ==
Chart (2004)	Peak position
Australia (ARIA)	32
