= Chameckilerner =

US-based dance and video collective

chameckilerner is a New York-based dance and video collective consisting of Rosane Chamecki and Andrea Lerner. Originally from Curitiba, Brazil, the duo was founded in 1992 primarily as a choreographic platform, but has since shifted their focus primarily to choreographing for the camera, video, and multi-channel installations. The shift in medium coincided with the premiere of their interdisciplinary performance EXIT at The Kitchen in 2007, which was deemed the "figurative killing off of the duo". They have been described as making use of "articulated movement ingrained in physical structures to define the psychological state of a body."

chameckilerner had their performance work presented at The Kitchen (2007); Dance Theater Workshop (1992, 1994, 1999, 2003); and Performance Space 122 (1995), New York, among others. In 2008 their first video work, Flying Lesson, premiered at the Dance on Camera Festival, Lincoln Center, New York where it won the Jury Award for Best Film. In 2008 they were recipients of the Guggenheim Fellowship, and have also received numerous grants and fellowships such as the Foundation for Contemporary Arts Grants to Artists award (1998), awards from New York State Council on The Arts, the Jerome Foundation, and EMPAC, and others. The duo has a forthcoming solo exhibition at Pierogi Gallery, Brooklyn, New York in February 2016. On October 20, 2023, the duo released Aging Prelude, their first live performance since 2007. The performances uses "...a physical vocabulary appropriated from paintings and sculptures of famous nudes throughout art history."
