= Mad Season (song) =

2001 single by Matchbox Twenty

Single by Matchbox Twenty

from the album Mad Season
- Released: February 26, 2001
- Length: 5:02
- Label: Atlantic; Lava; Melisma
- Songwriter: Rob Thomas
- Producer: Matt Serletic

Matchbox Twenty singles chronology
"Crutch" (2000)	"Mad Season" (2001)	"Last Beautiful Girl" (2001)

"Mad Season" is a song by American rock band Matchbox Twenty, released as the fourth single from their second album, Mad Season (2000), on February 26, 2001. The song peaked at number 48 on the US Billboard Hot 100 and reached the top 50 in Australia and New Zealand. In the United Kingdom, it peaked at number 76 on the UK Singles Chart.

== Background and writing ==
Rob Thomas told Billboard magazine that the song took a more universal tone but was originally about "the wild ride that the band has been on since success hit. The whole idea came from out mad season," he says. "It has nothing to do with being bad, it's just crazy. There are no handbooks for any of this."

== Music video ==
The song's music video, directed by Phil Harder, shows the band getting off a plane, surrounded by screaming fans trying to grab them. They are wearing what appear to be special passes, which say "Rock Star" on them, around their necks. Police are there trying to keep everything under control. The band eventually make it safely into their limousine, but then the crowd climbs all over the car, and it cannot go anywhere. The police fail to keep things under control, and the fans break the windows of the limousine. When they get inside, they rip the "Rock Star" passes off the band members, and then leave. This suggests that they did not really care about the band; they just wanted the passes.

== Track listings ==
- UK and European CD single
1. "Mad Season"
2. "Long Day" (live)
3. "Back 2 Good" (live)
- Australian CD single
1. "Mad Season" (album version)
2. "If You're Gone" (album version)
3. "Long Day" (live)

== Charts ==
=== Weekly charts ===
Chart (2001)	Peak position
Australia (ARIA)	42
New Zealand (Recorded Music NZ)	34
Scottish Singles Sales (Official Charts)	62
UK Singles (Official Charts)	76
US Billboard Hot 100	48
US Adult Pop Airplay (Billboard)	5
US Pop Airplay (Billboard)	20

=== Year-end charts ===
Chart (2001)	Position
Canada Radio (Nielsen BDS)	89
US Adult Top 40 (Billboard)	21
US Mainstream Top 40 (Billboard)	93

== Release history ==
Region	Date	Format(s)	Label(s)	Ref.
Australia	February 26, 2001	CD	Atlantic; Lava; Melisma	
United States	April 2, 2001	Triple A radio	Atlantic; Lava; Melisma	
United States	April 3, 2001	Contemporary hit; alternative radio	Atlantic; Lava; Melisma	
United Kingdom	June 18, 2001	CD; cassette	Atlantic; Lava; Melisma	
