= Steve Bjorklund =

American singer

Steve Bjorklund, also known as Steffan Bjorklund, was born ca. 1960 in Chicago, Illinois. He was an early figure in the first punk rock music scene in Chicago. He briefly attended Roycemore School in Evanston, Illinois. His first known recorded appearance was in July 1978, as a guitarist-singer with the protopunk-garage-New Wavish band The Rabbits, who opened a show in Schaumburg, Illinois by power-pop up-and-comers Pezband.

After the breakup of The Rabbits in the fall of 1978, Bjorklund formed the project band Strike Under with his brother, Chris. Strike Under produced one record, the 1981 5-track pressing, Immediate Action, which received mixed reviews but has nevertheless been called an "integral document to the history of punk rock in Chicago." Strike Under featured Pierre Kezdy, who would later play with Naked Raygun and Pegboy; the band, besides releasing its own record, also appeared on the seminal 1981 Busted at Oz LP, an historic document of the second wave of Chicago punk, recorded at the legendary club Oz before it closed down. Following the breakup of Strike Under, Bjorklund briefly formed another Chicago punk band, Terminal Beach. In 1987, Bjorklund's brother Chris, joined The Effigies, a more successful Chicago punk band fronted by Kezdy's brother John. Steve Bjorklund formed Breaking Circus in Chicago; their initial EP release included the memorable song (Knife in the) Marathon. He relocated to Minneapolis, where Breaking Circus continued. Breaking Circus was active through approximately 1988 and is considered an important example of early post-punk/industrial music in Minneapolis.

Later, Bjorklund was a member of Minneapolis band Balloon Guy. Bjorklund continued to work in the recording industry, with a number of punk bands in Chicago and Minneapolis, through the early 1990s, credited primarily as producer or as mastering re-mixer.

Since 2010, Bjorklund has collaborated with bassist Steve Economou (drummer for The Effigies) and keyboard player LizB in the band High Value Target.
