= Mad Season (Matchbox Twenty album) =

Studio album by Matchbox Twenty
- Released: May 23, 2000
- Studios: Tree Sound, Atlanta, Georgia; East Iris, Nashville; Ocean Way, Nashville
- Genres: Alternative rock; post-grunge; pop rock
- Length: 60:28
- Label: Atlantic
- Producer: Matt Serletic

Matchbox Twenty chronology
Yourself or Someone Like You (1996)	Mad Season (2000)	More Than You Think You Are (2002)

Singles from Mad Season
- 1. "Bent" Released: April 17, 2000; 2. "If You're Gone" Released: September 18, 2000; 3. "Crutch" Released: September 18, 2000; 4. "Mad Season" Released: February 26, 2001; 5. "Last Beautiful Girl" Released: September 4, 2001

Professional ratings
Aggregate scores
Source	Rating
Metacritic	57/100
Review scores
Source	Rating
AllMusic	4/5 stars
The Baltimore Sun	3/4 stars
Entertainment Weekly	C+
Los Angeles Times	2.5/4 stars
NME	1.5/5 stars
Q	3/5 stars
Rolling Stone	2.5/5 stars
The Rolling Stone Album Guide	3/5 stars
Sputnikmusic	5/5
The Village Voice	C+

Mad Season is the second studio album by American rock band Matchbox Twenty. It was released on May 23, 2000, by Atlantic Records. The album's first single, "Bent", became the band's first and only number-one single on the US Billboard Hot 100 chart. The next two singles, "If You're Gone" and "Crutch", were both released on September 18, 2000—"If You're Gone" was serviced to pop radio while "Crutch" was promoted at rock radio instead. "Mad Season" and "Last Beautiful Girl" were released as the album's final two singles in 2001.

== Recording and release ==
The album was a significant departure from the band's debut album, Yourself or Someone Like You, as it moved to a grander, poppier sound with orchestra and horn sections. While not as successful as its predecessor, the album entered and peaked at number three on the Billboard 200 with first week sales of 365,000 and was certified 4× Platinum in the United States in October 2001.

== Track listing ==
All tracks are written by Rob Thomas, except where noted.

No.	Title	Writer(s)	Length
1.	"Angry"		3:44
2.	"Black & White People"		3:45
3.	"Crutch"		3:25
4.	"Last Beautiful Girl"	Thomas; Matt Serletic	4:03
5.	"If You're Gone"		4:34
6.	"Mad Season"		5:02
7.	"Rest Stop"		4:29
8.	"The Burn"		3:27
9.	"Bent"		4:16
10.	"Bed of Lies"	Thomas; Serletic	5:22
11.	"Leave"		4:33
12.	"Stop"	Thomas; Paul Doucette	3:49
13.	"You Won't Be Mine"		9:52 (Note: With the addition of silence and the orchestral reprise.)
Total length:			60:28

Deluxe edition bonus tracks
No.	Title	Writer(s)	Length
14.	"You Won't Be Mine" (Orchestral Reprise)		2:04
15.	"You & I & I"		3:29
16.	"Suffer Me"		3:10
17.	"Never Going Back Again"	Lindsey Buckingham	3:47

Malaysian edition bonus tracks
No.	Title	Writer(s)	Length
14.	"Bent" (Live in Seattle)
15.	"Back 2 Good" (Live in Seattle; also on the "Back 2 Good" single)	Thomas; Serletic
16.	"Don't Let Me Down" (Live in Australia; also on the "Back 2 Good" single)	Lennon–McCartney

== Personnel ==
Matchbox Twenty

- Rob Thomas – lead vocals, piano, rhythm guitar
- Kyle Cook – lead guitar, backing vocals
- Adam Gaynor – rhythm guitar, backing vocals
- Brian Yale – bass guitar
- Paul Doucette – drums, acoustic guitar on "Stop"

Additional musicians

- Angie Aparo – background vocals on "Stop"
- Peter Stuart – background vocals on "The Burn"
- Sam Bacco – percussion on "Last Beautiful Girl"
- Tony Adams – additional drums on "Stop"
- Matt Serletic – orchestra composer
- Nashville String Machine – string arrangements on "Rest Stop", "Leave", "You Won't Be Mine" and "Bed of Lies"
- Atlanta Brass Society – Horn arrangements on "If You're Gone" and "Black and White People"

Production

- Mark Dobson – additional engineering, Pro-Tools and digital editing
- David Thoener – mixing
- Shawn Grove – additional Pro-Tool editing, assistant engineering
- Robert Hannon – assistant engineering
- Greg Fogie – assistant engineering
- Kevin Szymanski – assistant engineering
- Stephen Marcussen – mastering
- Stewart Whitmore – mastering

Artwork

- Ria Lewerke, Doug Reichert, Paul Doucette, Imagic – art direction and design
- Michael Sowa – cover art
- Dean Karr – photography
- Andrew Macpherson – photography (center spread and page 19)

== Charts ==
=== Weekly charts ===
Weekly chart performance for Mad Season
Chart (2000)	Peak position
Australian Albums (ARIA)	1
Canadian Albums (Billboard)	3
Dutch Albums (Album Top 100)	60
German Albums (Offizielle Top 100)	11
New Zealand Albums (RMNZ)	7
Scottish Albums (Official Charts)	18
Swedish Albums (Sverigetopplistan)	44
Swiss Albums (Schweizer Hitparade)	57
UK Albums (Official Charts)	31
US Billboard 200	3

=== Year-end charts ===
2000 year-end chart performance for Mad Season
Chart (2000)	Position
Australian Albums (ARIA)	15
Canadian Albums (Nielsen SoundScan)	23
US Billboard 200	39

2001 year-end chart performance for Mad Season
Chart (2001)	Position
Australian Albums (ARIA)	30
Canadian Albums (Nielsen SoundScan)	81
US Billboard 200	46

=== Decade-end charts ===
Decade-end chart performance for Mad Season
Chart (2000–2009)	Position
Australian Albums (ARIA)	96
US Billboard 200	85

== Certifications ==
Certifications for Mad Season
Region	Certification	Certified units/sales
Australia (ARIA)	4× Platinum	280,000^{^}
Canada (Music Canada)	3× Platinum	300,000^{^}
New Zealand (RMNZ)	Gold	7,500^{^}
United Kingdom (BPI)	Gold	100,000^{^}
United States (RIAA)	4× Platinum	4,000,000^{^}
^{^} Shipments figures based on certification alone.
