= Disease (Matchbox Twenty song) =

2002 single by Matchbox Twenty

Single by Matchbox Twenty

from the album More Than You Think You Are
- Released: September 30, 2002
- Studio: Bearsville (Bearsville, New York); The Hit Factory (New York City)
- Length: 3:43
- Label: Atlantic; Melisma
- Songwriters: Rob Thomas; Mick Jagger
- Producer: Matt Serletic

Matchbox Twenty singles chronology
"Last Beautiful Girl" (2001)	"Disease" (2002)	"Unwell" (2003)

"Disease" is the first single released from American rock band Matchbox Twenty's third album, More Than You Think You Are. The track was co-written by Matchbox Twenty lead singer Rob Thomas and Rolling Stones frontman Mick Jagger. Released on September 30, 2002, the song peaked at number 29 on the US Billboard Hot 100. "Disease" was one of two songs written by Thomas and presented to Jagger while he was producing his solo album Goddess in the Doorway, alongside "Visions of Paradise". Jagger returned "Disease" to Thomas, saying, "It sounds like you. It's your song."

== Music video ==
The video, directed by Phil Harder, starts with a man turning on his colorful boomboxing, then roller skating over a wide section of New York City, amid images of the band illuminated on moving billboards. During the second chorus, we see the band performing in a large outdoor roller-rink, complete with a disco ball. They are surrounded by a crowd dancing along, and to begin the third chorus, Rob slides off the stage on all fours onto the dance floor past the crowd. At the end of the song, the roller skater shuts off his beat box and then proceeds up some stairs, presumably to his home.

== Track listings ==
- Australian CD single
1. "Disease"
2. "Push" (country version from VH1 Storytellers)
3. "Crutch" (from VH1 Storytellers)
- German CD single
1. "Disease"
2. "If You're Gone" (live)
- UK CD single
1. "Disease"
2. "If You're Gone" (live)
3. "Disease" (acoustic)

== Credits and personnel ==
Credits are taken from the More Than You Think You Are album booklet.

Studios

- Recorded at Bearsville Studios (Bearsville, New York) and The Hit Factory (New York City)
- Mixed at The Hit Factory (New York City)
- Mastered at Marcussen Mastering (Hollywood, California)

Main personnel

- Rob Thomas – writing, vocals
- Kyle Cook – background vocals, lead guitar
- Adam Gaynor – background vocals, rhythm guitar
- Brian Yale – bass
- Paul Doucette – drums, percussion
- Mick Jagger – writing
- Vaneese Thomas – background vocals
- Lydia Mann-Jaime – background vocals
- Matt Serletic – keyboards, production
- Greg Collins – recording, additional mixing
- Jim Scott – mixing
- Chris Testa – mixing assistance
- Mark Dodson – Pro Tools, digital editing, additional engineering
- Pat Woodward – additional engineering
- Stephen Marcussen – mastering
- Stewart Whitmore – mastering

Strings section

- Carol Webb – violin, concertmaster
- Enrico Dicecco – violin
- Jonathan Dinklage – violin
- Barry Finclair – violin
- Maura Giannini – violin
- Jan Mullen – violin
- Ricky Sortomme – violin
- Donna Tecco – violin
- Sue Pray – viola
- Sarah Adams – viola
- Crystal Garner – viola
- Vincent Lionti – viola

== Charts ==
=== Weekly charts ===
Chart (2002–2003)	Peak position
Australia (ARIA)	31
Germany (GfK)	85
Netherlands (Single Top 100)	89
Scottish Singles Sales (Official Charts)	33
UK Singles (Official Charts)	50
US Billboard Hot 100	29
US Adult Alternative Airplay (Billboard)	5
US Adult Pop Airplay (Billboard)	4
US Pop Airplay (Billboard)	21

=== Year-end charts ===
Chart (2002)	Position
US Adult Top 40 (Billboard)	49

Chart (2003)	Position
US Adult Top 40 (Billboard)	24
US Mainstream Top 40 (Billboard)	100
US Triple-A (Billboard)	36

== Release history ==
Region	Date	Format(s)	Label(s)	Ref.
United States	September 30, 2002	Radio	Atlantic; Melisma	
Australia	October 28, 2002	CD	Atlantic; Melisma	
United Kingdom	February 10, 2003	CD	Atlantic; Melisma	
