= Young Love (Mat Kearney album) =

Studio album by Mat Kearney
- Released: August 2, 2011
- Studios: Nashville, TN at The Compound, Kustom Deluxe Studio, Mat's Home Studio, Sound Emporium, Blackbird Studios and The Space Vineyard
- Genres: Rock, pop, hip-hop
- Length: 39:16
- Labels: Aware, Universal Republic
- Producers: Robert Marvin, Jason Lehning, Gregg Latterman (exec.),

Mat Kearney chronology
City of Black & White (2009)	Young Love (2011)	Just Kids (2015)

Singles from Young Love
- 1. "Hey Mama" Released: May 10, 2011; 2. "Down" Released: 2011; 3. "Ships in the Night" Released: November 2011

Young Love is the fourth studio album from Nashville singer-songwriter, Mat Kearney. It was released on August 2, 2011, although some who pre-purchased the album through Mat Kearney's site received it as early as July 29, 2011. On May 1, 2012, a deluxe edition of the album was released with five bonus songs and a video for "Ships in the Night".

== Promotion ==
Over the months leading up to this, Kearney released several videos of his studio sessions. These videos revealed that this album features the rap style that could be heard on Nothing Left to Lose but not City of Black and White. Kearney described it as being a "return to innocence." Blinking Lights and Intimate Things was considered as an alternate album title.

=== Singles ===
The album's first single, "Hey Mama", was released on May 10, 2011 as a digital download. The album's track listing, artwork, and release date were revealed on June 13, 2011.

== Critical reception ==
Professional ratings
Review scores
Source	Rating
AbsolutePunk	90%
Allmusic	4/5 stars
Alt Rock Liver	9/10 stars
CCM Magazine	4/5 stars
Christian Manifesto	4/5 stars
Christian Music Zine	4/5 stars
Christianity Today	4/5 stars
Cross Rhythms	9/10 stars
Jesus Freak Hideout	4.5/5 stars
Jesus Freak Hideout (Nathaniel Schexnayder)	3.5/5 stars
Louder Than the Music (Jono Davies)	4.5/5 stars
New Release Tuesday	4.5/5 stars
New Release Tuesday	3.5/5 stars
New Release Tuesday	5/5 stars
Rolling Stone	2.5/5 stars

AbsolutePunk's Craig Manning said of Young Love that it "will reach the same level for me as the other two, but for now, it stands as one of my favorite records in what has been an extraordinarily strong year for music, and a big part of the soundtrack to my summer. If Kearney's next three records are half as good as these three, he'll be one of those guys I follow for a long time. Here's hoping."

Allmusic's Jared Johnson said of Young Love that it "could be considered his arrival record, finding the right flavor of hip-hop, adult alternative, and classic storytelling...comes off much like the opening weeks of a relationship, where moments bounce between earnest and playful, heavy and light, but each ultimately memorable in its own way...a noteworthy release that reveals more layers the longer you listen."

Alt Rock Live's Jonathan Faulkner said that it "may go down in history as being one of his best ever"

CCM Magazine's Matt Conner said' "the one element that separates Mat Kearney from the typical troubadour pack is his affinity for rap, hip-hop, and groove-induced arrangements, which blends tightly with sparse sound and his spiritually-charged songwriting...[and] Young Love [was] (a title inspired by his recent marriage)."

Christian Manifesto's Ryan Spooner said it "is engaging, authentic, accessible and fun. I’m out of touch with what’s on top 40 radio these days, but I’m pretty sure Kearney makes the kind of stuff that belongs there. And unlike a lot of that material, if Kearney’s music came on the dial I’m pretty sure I’d turn it up – whether I had heard it before or not."

Christian Music Zine's David Huey said it "is definitely more of a pop album than how he began his career. The acoustic guitars rarely make an appearance...You know how some pop albums feel like every song is exactly the same song with different lyrics? Young Love doesn’t give you that. I’m not the world’s biggest pop music fan, and I was able to listen straight through without wanting to skip around. This is definitely a positive album, rather than a Christian album. If you’re looking for vertical worship music, this isn’t what you want. It’s still good quality pop music that’s much more in line with what’s currently popular than the majority of the Christian pop albums out there...This isn’t a personal favorite of mine, but the pop loving crowd should be all over this."

Christianity Today's Ron Augustine said "the singer-songwriter attains his highest production values yet, resulting in a summer record that people of all ages and faiths can enjoy."

Cross Rhythms Neil Fix said "It would probably be fair to say that they mostly have a pop rock base, particularly the drums, which a friend described as tribal; but there is a lot more than that in them."

Jesus Freak Hideout's Jerold Wallace said it "is another solid release from one of the industry’s best talents. The album does not have many direct references to Christian themes, but it does manage to avoid any clichés with solid songwriting from beginning to end. The sound remains very similar to the previous releases, but with a bit more polish and confidence. None of the tracks seem to be flippantly thrown in to clutter the album; they are all significant inclusions and worth a listen."

Jesus Freak Hideout Nathaniel Schexnayder said it "works just fine in its own niche, I can’t help but wonder how the final result would have sounded if the album would have featured a little more the very best of what Kearney offered on previous efforts. Throw in the discretion that should accompany all of those who pick up the album, and you are left with a good project that falls short of being great."

Louder Than the Music's Jono Davies said "The press release for this album intrigued me with the comment 'After becoming a licensed cab driver in hometown, Nashville, Tennessee, Kearney found lyrical inspiration for Young Love through the conversations he had with passengers.' Of course some of the best songs of all time are stories, and the real life stories which Mat has crafted from his passengers' tales make an interesting concept for this album. From this he has created 10 very strong singable choruses ready to be the soundtrack of those summer evenings."

New Release Tuesday's Kevin Davis said it is "revisiting the heavy grooves, spoken word, and sing-able choruses fans came to love from sophomore-release, Nothing Left To Lose...[and Young Love] is a great listen...If you like the musical styles of Brandon Heath and Matthew West, you'll like the musical style of this album, but lyrically it is much more like The Fray and Jack Johnson."

New Release Tuesday's WOOKIE said it "falls short of the standard Kearney set with his previous releases...it would be a mistake to overlook this album on that merit alone...Fans hoping to see/hear Kearney go back to material like Nothing Left to Lose won’t find it here. The usual themes are present: love, pain, redemption. However, the album’s lyrical content is very different than in past albums, exploring the intricacies of romantic relationships rather than the general questions of life. I’d say three-quarters of the album is enjoyable enough to make the album a solid effort worth a listen."

New Release Tuesday's Kevin McNeese said it "is filled with many musical moments that are hard to ignore...as the title suggests, revisits a time of falling in love. A time filled with butterflies, happiness, discovery, innocence and more, reflecting Mat's own life of recently getting married...Lyrically, the album is wonderful but like Owl City, there's not a ton of spiritual take away here. I'm ok with that because Mat's been very open about his own spirituality and I'm one that believes we need just as many positive songs about relationships and love as we do about our relationship with Christ. After all, there's more to love in this life than God and He designed it that way. We have our significant others, our family members, our friends and that's life. Mat sings about life and places his lyrics against a musical landscape that continues to be refreshing, relevant, intricate and inventive. If you enjoy great music, you don't want to miss this album."

Rolling Stone's Monica Herrera said it "gets back to the percussive, reggae-lite ditties that went missing on his last album...[and] the genre-mixing doesn't always work...[but] with melodies this hummable, though, Kearney should be soundtracking another Grey's Anatomy scene in no time."

== Commercial performance ==
The album debuted at four on the Billboard 200, a new chart high and best sales week ever for Kearney, with 44,000 copies sold. As of February 2015, the album has sold 213,000 copies in the United States.

== Track listing ==
No.	Title	Writer(s)	Producer(s)	Length
1.	"Hey Mama"	Mat Kearney, Jason Lehning	Robert Marvin, Lehning	2:57
2.	"Ships in the Night"	Kearney, Robert Marvin, Joshua Crosby, Lehning	Marvin, Lehning	4:15
3.	"Count on Me"	Kearney, Marvin, Lehning	Marvin, Lehning	3:05
4.	"Sooner or Later"	Kearney, Marvin, Lehning, Crosby, Nate Campany	Marvin, Lehning	3:56
5.	"Chasing the Light"	Kearney, Marvin, Crosby, Lehning	Marvin, Lehning	4:26
6.	"Learning to Love Again"	Kearney	Marvin, Lehning	4:24
7.	"Down"	Kearney, Marvin	Marvin, Lehning	4:00
8.	"She Got the Honey"	Kearney, Matt Mahaffey	Marvin, Lehning	3:14
9.	"Young Dumb and In Love"	Kearney, Marvin, Lehning	Marvin, Lehning	3:24
10.	"Rochester"	Kearney	Lehning	5:37

iTunes Store bonus track
No.	Title	Writer(s)	Producer(s)	Length
11.	"Seventeen"	Kearney	Marvin, Lehning	4:23

TheMatKearneyStore.com bonus track
No.	Title	Writer(s)	Producer(s)	Length
11.	"Two Hearts"	Kearney, Marvin, Lehning	Marvin, Lehning	3:45

Best Buy bonus tracks
No.	Title	Writer(s)	Producer(s)	Length
11.	"Head Or Your Heart"	Kearney	Marvin, Lehning	3:19
12.	"Virginia Is For Lovers"	Kearney, Phil Madeira	Marvin, Lehning	3:46
13.	"Hawthorne"	Kearney, Chip Kilpatrick	Marvin, Lehning	2:46

Deluxe edition bonus tracks
No.	Title	Writer(s)	Producer(s)	Length
11.	"Seventeen" (iTunes version only)	Kearney	Marvin, Lehning	4:23
12.	"Runaway"	Kearney, Marvin, Lehning	Marvin, Lehning	3:51
13.	"What She Wants"	Kearney, Trent Dabbs	Robert Marvin	3:37
14.	"Head or Your Heart"	Kearney	Marvin, Lehning	3:26
15.	"Two Hearts"	Kearney, Marvin, Lehning	Marvin, Lehning	3:58
16.	"Ships In the Night" (music video)			4:05

== Personnel ==
- Mat Kearney – vocals, keyboards, programming, guitars, percussion
- Jason Lehning – keyboards, programming, guitars, bass, drums, percussion
- Robert Marvin – keyboards, programming, backing vocals
- Joshua Crosby – keyboards, programming, drums, backing vocals
- Ian Fitchuk – keyboards, drums, percussion
- Andy Selby – additional programming on "Chasing the Light"
- Matt Mahaffey – acoustic piano, additional programming and bass on "She Got the Honey"
- Tyler Burkum – guitars
- Jerry McPherson – guitars
- Bryan Sutton – guitars, mandolin
- Jordan Lehning – guitars, harp, percussion
- Dustin Sauder – additional guitars on "Sooner or Later"
- Jason Goforth – lap steel guitar on "Rochester"
- Tony Lucido – bass
- Adam Keafer – bass on "Hey Mama"
- Claire Indie – cello on "Hey Mama"
- Alli Jacobs, Morgan Jacobs and Ellie Marvin – group vocals on "Count on Me"

== Production ==
- Gregg Latterman – executive producer, management
- Patch Culbertson – A&R
- Gillian Russell – A&R
- Steve Smith – A&R
- Jason Lehning – recording, mixing (6, 10)
- Robert Marvin – recording (1–9)
- Manny Marroquin – mixing (1–5, 7, 8, 9)
- Josh Crosby – assistant engineer
- Gordon Hammond – assistant engineer
- Mat Kearney – assistant engineer
- Jordan Lehning – assistant engineer
- Erik Madrid – mix engineer
- Chris Galland – assistant mix engineer
- Andy Selby – editing
- Brian Gardner – mastering
- Joe Spix – art direction, design
- Pamela Littky – photography
- Jason Rio – management
- Mixed at The Compound (Nashville, Tennessee) and Larrabee Sound Studios (North Hollywood, California).
- Mastered at Bernie Grundman Mastering (Hollywood, California).

== Charts ==
=== Album ===
Chart (2011)	Peak position
US Billboard 200	4
US Billboard Digital Albums	1
US Billboard Christian Albums	1
US Billboard Rock Albums	1
US Billboard Canadian Albums	20

=== Year-end charts ===
Chart (2011)	Positions
US Billboard Top Rock Albums	67
US Billboard Top Christian Albums	16

=== Singles ===
Year	Single	Peak chart positions				
Year	Single	US Christian	US Rock	US Adult Pop	US Digital	US Hot 100
2011	"Hey Mama"	—	38	18	—	—
2011	"Down"	21	—	—	—	—
2011	"Ships In the Night"	32	—	25	56	87

== Use in media ==
Apple used the Young Love album art in product images for the company's sixth generation green iPod Nano.
