= The Chicago EP =

EP by Mat Kearney
- Released: 2005
- Genre: Rock, Pop, Acoustic
- Length: 21:30
- Label: Aware / Columbia

Mat Kearney chronology
Bullet (2004)	The Chicago EP (2005)	Nothing Left to Lose (2006)

The Chicago EP is an EP album by Mat Kearney released in 2005 on Aware/Columbia Records to promote his then upcoming album Nothing Left to Lose (2006). It is a rare item and is now out of print.

== Track listing ==
1. "Nothing Left to Lose" – 4:24
2. "Undeniable" – 4:25
3. "Chicago" [Acoustic Version] – 4:16
4. "Girl America" [Acoustic Version] – 4:17
5. "In The Middle" [Acoustic Version] – 4:03

=== Notes ===
- Although "Chicago" is an acoustic version, there has been no studio version released. It is believed there was a studio version recorded for Nothing Left to Lose but was cut from the album.
