= City of Black & White =

Studio album by Mat Kearney
- Released: May 19, 2009
- Studios: Blackbird (Nashville, Tennessee)
- Genres: Rock, pop, acoustic
- Length: 50:02; 63:45 (Bonus Track Version)
- Label: Aware / Columbia
- Producers: Robert Marvin, Mat Kearney

Mat Kearney chronology
Nothing Left to Lose (2006)	City of Black & White (2009)	Young Love (2011)

Singles from City of Black & White
- 1. "Closer to Love" Released: March 10, 2009; 2. "All I Have" Released: 2009

Professional ratings
Review scores
Source	Rating
Allmusic	3.5/5 stars
The Album Project	4/5 stars
Jesus Freak Hideout	4/5 stars

City of Black & White is the third studio album by Mat Kearney. Released on May 19, 2009, it follows his 2006 major-label debut, Nothing Left to Lose. The first single, "Closer to Love", was released on March 10, 2009, as a digital download. To promote the album, Kearney toured with Keane and the Helio Sequence. On the day of its release, the bonus track version peaked at #7 on the iTunes Top Albums, and the standard version peaked at #19. Kearney wrote the title track while traveling in Turkey. He explained that this song "was born on a ferry as I crossed the Bosphorus River, which splits Istanbul in two". "Fire & Rain" was also released as a digital download to MySpace the week of the album release. Immediately after the album was released, "Lifeline" was used in commercial advertisement for season 3 of Lifetime Television's Army Wives. The commercial has been aired not only on Lifetime but ABC as well.

According to Soundscan, as of September 21, 2010, City of Black & White has sold 87,459 copies in the US.

== Track listing ==
All songs written by Mat Kearney unless stated otherwise.

1. "All I Have" – 4:49
2. "Fire & Rain" – 3:50 (Mat Kearney, Robert Marvin)
3. "Closer to Love" – 3:37 (Mat Kearney, Robert Marvin, Josiah Bell)
4. "Here We Go" – 4:14 (Mat Kearney, Robert Marvin)
5. "Lifeline" – 4:14 (Mat Kearney, Trent Dabbs, Matthew Perryman Jones)
6. "New York to California" – 4:15
7. "Runaway Car" – 4:12
8. "Never Be Ready" – 3:37 (Mat Kearney, Trent Dabbs, Hilary Lindsey)
9. "Annie" – 3:49
10. "Straight Away" – 3:51
11. "On & On" – 4:02 (Mat Kearney, Kate York)
12. "City of Black & White" – 5:38 (Mat Kearney, Michael Logen)
13. "Everyone I Know" (iTunes bonus track) – 4:33
14. "Here We Go (Acoustic)" (iTunes bonus track) – 4:04
15. "All I Have (Acoustic)" (iTunes bonus video) – 5:06
16. "Closer to Love (Acoustic)" (iTunes pre-order bonus track) – 5:06
17. "Save A Line" (Best Buy bonus track) – 4:09
18. "Fire & Rain (Acoustic)" (Best Buy bonus track) – 3:51

== City of Black & White Revisited (EP) ==
In 2019, to celebrate the tenth anniversary of the album, an EP titled City of Black & White Revisited was released. It peaked at number 46 on the Top Christian Albums chart.

=== Track listing ===
1. "City of Black & White (Re-recorded)"
2. "All I Have (Re-recorded)"
3. "Fire & Rain (Re-recorded)"
4. "New York To California (Re-recorded)"
5. "Closer To Love (Re-recorded)"

== Personnel ==
- Mat Kearney – vocals, acoustic guitar (1, 2, 3, 5, 7–12), electric guitar (2, 3, 4, 6, 7, 9, 10, 11), Yamaha CP-70 electric grand piano (4), keyboards (5), acoustic piano (6, 10), synthesizers (6, 11), vocal choir (6), bells (7), mandolin (12)
- Robert Marvin – acoustic piano (1, 2), synthesizers (2, 3, 4, 7, 8, 9, 12), programming (2, 3), keyboards (3, 4, 11), vocoder (4, 12), tack piano (5), bass (7, 8, 12), Yamaha CP-70 electric grand piano (8, 9), sampler (11), recorder (12)
- Josiah Bell – programming (3, 10)
- Jason Lehning – keyboards (11, 12), electric guitar (11)
- Tyler Burkum – acoustic guitar (1), electric guitar (1)
- Paul Moak – electric guitar (3, 5–11)
- Lynn Nichols – electric guitar (4, 5, 8)
- Dan Brigham – electric guitar (10), programming (12), guitar (12), cello (12)
- Gabe Scott – dulcimer (3, 12), steel guitar (6, 12)
- Tony Lucido – bass (1, 2, 4–8, 10, 11)
- Mike Elizondo – bass (3)
- Aaron Sands – bass (9)
- Jeremy Lutito – drums (1, 2)
- Aaron Sterling – drums (3, 5, 7, 9–11)
- Josh Crosby – drums (4)
- Will Sayles – drums (8)
- Claire Indie – cello (6)

== Production ==
- Mat Kearney – producer
- Robert Marvin – producer, engineer (1, 2, 6), mixing (6, 8)
- Steve Smith – A&R
- Chris Testa – engineer (3, 4, 5, 7–12)
- Paul Moak – engineer (5)
- Kene "Ghost" Bell – assistant engineer (1, 2)
- Dan Martine – assistant engineer (3, 4, 5, 7–12)
- Lowell Reynolds – assistant engineer (3, 4, 5, 7–12)
- Michael H. Brauer – mixing (1–5, 7, 9–12)
- Andy Selby – editing
- Bob Ludwig – mastering at Gateway Mastering (Portland, Maine)
- Maria Paula Marulanda – art direction, design
- James Minchin III – photography
- Gregg Latterman – management
- Jason Rio – management

== Charts ==
Chart performance for City of Black & White
Chart (2006)	Peak position
US Billboard 200	13
US Top Christian Albums (Billboard)	1
US Top Rock Albums (Billboard)	3
