= That's Exactly What I Wanted... Exactly That =

2007 album by Wheat

That's Exactly What I Wanted ... Exactly That

EP by Wheat
- Released: March 2007
- Genre: indie rock
- Length: 15:07
- Label: Empyrean
- Producer: Wheat and Rick Lescault

That's Exactly What I Wanted ... Exactly That is a 2007 EP by Wheat that preceded the release of their fourth album, Everyday I Said a Prayer for Kathy and Made a One Inch Square.

== Track listing ==
All songs written by Wheat (Brendan Harney and Scott Levesque).

1. What Everyone Keeps Telling Me – 2:55
2. Little White Dove – 3:37
3. Until It Takes – 3:52
4. That's Exactly What I Wanted ... Exactly That – 1:47
5. Washing Machine Blues – 2:56

== Production notes ==
Recorded at Electric Ali (Fairhaven, Mass.); additional recording by Wheat at home. Mixed by Rick Lescault. Mastered by Jeff Lipton at Peerless Mastering (Boston, Mass.).
