= Breathe In Breathe Out (disambiguation) =

Breathe In. Breathe Out. is an album by Hillary Duff.

Breathe In Breathe Out may also refer to:

- "Breathe In Breathe Out", a song by Kanye West from The College Dropout
- "Breathe In Breathe Out", a song by Mat Kearney from Nothing Left to Lose

== See also ==
- "Breathe In, Breathe Out, Move On", a song by Jimmy Buffett from Take the Weather with You
- "Machinehead" (song), by Bush, 1996
