= Per Second, Per Second, Per Second... Every Second =

Per Second, Per Second, Per Second ... Every Second

Studio album by Wheat
- Released: November 4, 2003
- Recorded: 2002
- Genre: Indie rock, indie pop
- Length: 48:50
- Label: Aware/Columbia
- Producer: Dave Fridmann and Wheat ("Breathe" and "Closer to Mercury" produced by John Fields and Wheat)

Wheat chronology
Hope and Adams (1999)	Per Second, Per Second, Per Second ... Every Second (2003)	Everyday I Said a Prayer for Kathy and Made a One Inch Square (2007)

Professional ratings
Aggregate scores
Source	Rating
Metacritic	66/100
Review scores
Source	Rating
Allmusic	4/5 stars
Pitchfork Media	(7.8/10)
Village Voice	(dud)

Per Second, Per Second, Per Second ... Every Second is the third and (so far) only major-label album by Wheat. It was released on Aware Records via a distribution deal with Columbia Records in November 2003.

== Track listing ==
All songs were written by band-members Ricky Brennan Jr., Brendan Harney, and Scott Levesque.

1. "I Met a Girl" – 3:59
2. "Breathe" – 3:16
3. "These Are Things" – 4:06
4. "Life Still Applies" – 3:02
5. "Go Get the Cops" – 3:43
6. "Some Days" – 3:23
7. "World United Already" – 4:21
8. "Hey, So Long (Ohio)" – 2:50
9. "The Beginner" – 3:39
10. "Can't Wash It Off" – 3:34
11. "Closer to Mercury" – 3:51
12. "This Rough Magic" – 5:26
13. [silent interlude] – 0:31 (hidden track)
14. "Don't I Hold You" [2003 Version] – 3:40 (hidden track)

== Production notes ==
The album was recorded and mixed in the fall of 2002 at Room 9 From Outer Space (South Boston, Massachusetts), Tarbox Road Studios (Cassadaga, New York), Mansfield Lodge (Los Angeles, California), Conway Recording Studios (Los Angeles, California), Pain and Pleasure Studios (Providence, Rhode Island), and Sound Station Seven (Providence, Rhode Island).

The album was mastered by Greg Calbi at Sterling Sound (New York City).

== Track notes ==
"Some Days" was featured on the soundtrack to Win a Date With Tad Hamilton!

"I Met a Girl" appeared in the movie A Cinderella Story.

The 2003 version of "Don't I Hold You" was featured in the Cameron Crowe film Elizabethtown.
