= Undeniable (Mat Kearney song) =

Single by Mat Kearney

from the album Bullet and Nothing Left to Lose
- Released: 2007
- Recorded: 2007
- Genre: Pop, alternative hip hop
- Length: 4:28
- Label: Aware
- Songwriter: Kearney/Robert "Aurel M" Marvin

Mat Kearney singles chronology
"Nothing Left to Lose" (2006)	"Undeniable" (2007)	"Breathe In, Breathe Out" (2007)

"Undeniable" is the second single from Mat Kearney's second album, Nothing Left to Lose.

== Charts ==
=== Weekly charts ===
Chart performance for "Undeniable"
Chart (2007–08)	Peak position
US Bubbling Under Hot 100 (Billboard)	16
US Adult Pop Airplay (Billboard)	16
US Christian AC (Billboard)	27
US Pop Airplay (Billboard)	30

=== Year-end charts ===
Chart (2006)	Position
US Adult Top 40 (Billboard)	29
Chart (2007)	Position
US Adult Top 40 (Billboard)	24

== Media ==
This song has been featured on Cold Case.
