= Undeniable =

Undeniable may refer to:

== Albums ==
- Undeniable (AZ album)
- Undeniable (Chipmunks album)
- Undeniable (Raven-Symoné album)
- Undeniable (Hellyeah album) (stylized as Unden!able), released 2016

== Songs ==
- "Undeniable" (Mat Kearney song), from Mat Kearney's second album Nothing Left to Lose
- "Undeniable", a song by Dannii Minogue from her 2007 album Unleashed
- "Undeniable" (Kygo song), 2021 single by Kygo featuring X Ambassadors

== Other uses ==
- Undeniable (TV series), a British television thriller serial
- Undeniable: Evolution and the Science of Creation, a book by Bill Nye
