= Just Kids (album) =

Studio album by Mat Kearney
- Released: February 24, 2015
- Genre: Rock, pop, hip hop
- Length: 50:53
- Label: Aware/Republic/Inpop

Mat Kearney chronology
Young Love (2011)	Just Kids (2015)	Crazytalk (2018)

Singles from Just Kids
- 1. "Heartbeat" Released: November 4, 2014; 2. "One Heart (Christian AC only)" Released: January 16, 2015; 3. "Billion" Released: February 17, 2015; 4. "Air I Breathe (Christian AC only)" Released: June 16, 2015

Just Kids, stylized as JUST KIDS, is the fifth album from Mat Kearney. Republic Records alongside Inpop Records released the project on February 24, 2015.

== Reception ==
Professional ratings
Review scores
Source	Rating
365 Days of Inspiring Media	4/5 stars
AbsolutePunk	7.0/10
CCM Magazine	4/5 stars
Christian Review Magazine	4.5/5 stars
CM Addict	4/5 stars
Cross Rhythms	10/10 squares
FDRMX	4.9 stars on a 5 point scale
Indie Vision Music	3/5 stars
Jesus Freak Hideout	4/5 stars 4.5/5 stars 3.5/5 stars
Louder Than the Music	4/5 stars
New Release Tuesday	4.5/5 stars

Gregory Robson, referencing in a seven out of ten review from AbsolutePunk, declares, "If Just Kids proves anything, it is that Kearney is still crafting albums that are unrelenting in their charisma." In a four star review by CCM Magazine, Matt Conner states, "Kearney's new album is just as irresistibly hypnotic as previous releases... but Kearney's seasoned status gives Just Kids a more substantive feel." Jessica Morris, awarding the album 4.9 out of five stars at FDRMX, writes, "Cool and fun, yet insightful and honest, Just Kids is everything we could have hoped for and more."

Timothy Estabrooks, indicating in a four star review for Jesus Freak Hideout, recognizes, "Just Kids [is] an excellent example of a pop album done the right way". Signaling in a four and a half star review from New Release Tuesday, responds, "Mat Kearney delivers nostalgia perfection on Just Kids." Ian Zandi, mentioning in a three star review by Indie Vision Music, grasps, how he "truly believe[s] that this is not the solid record that many think it to be. It is not a bad piece of work by any means, but I am going to call it what it is. A so-so record." Delivering a perfect ten review from Cross Rhythms, Tony Cummings regards it as a release he'll be, "playing for years to come."

Joshua Andre, awarding the album four stars at 365 Days of Inspiring Media, writes he, "found some gems and treasures in unexpected places." Awarding the album four stars by CM Addict, Jon Ownbey says, "JUST KIDS is a feel good album that is emotionally upbeat and flows well." Jono Davies, rating the album four stars at Louder Than the Music, writes, "If you're looking for positive, happy, melodic, modern mainstream music then this is worth a purchase." Writing a review for Christian Review Magazine, Leah St. John rating the album four and a half stars, states, "Mat Kearney has crafted a great album, which makes for an enjoyable listen."

== Track listing ==
No.	Title	Writer(s)	Length
1.	"Heartbreak Dreamer"	Mat Kearney, Anis Mojgani	5:19
2.	"Moving On"	Kearney	3:54
3.	"Just Kids"	Kearney	4:52
4.	"Heartbeat"	Kearney	3:38
5.	"Billion"	Kearney, Martin Johnson, Joshua Crosby	3:22
6.	"One Black Sheep"	Kearney, Martin Johnson	3:17
7.	"Let It Rain"	Kearney, Trent Dabbs	3:58
8.	"Ghost"	Kearney, Jeff Sojka, Josh Zegan	3:57
9.	"Los Angeles"	Kearney, Mason Levy, Tom Meredith	3:41
10.	"Miss You"	Kearney, Rami Yacoub	3:33
11.	"The Conversation" (featuring Young Summer)	Kearney, Annie Kearney	3:21
12.	"One Heart"	Kearney, Mason Levy, Tom Meredith	3:24
13.	"Shasta"	Kearney	4:57
Total length:			51:19

Just Kids – CBA (Christian retail)
No.	Title	Writer(s)	Length
14.	"Air I Breathe"	Kearney, Seth Mosley	3:41

Just Kids – Amazon Deluxe Edition
No.	Title	Writer(s)	Length
14.	"Air I Breathe"	Kearney, Seth Mosley	3:41
15.	"Coming Home (Oregon)"	Kearney	3:24

== Charts ==
Chart (2015)	Peak position
US Billboard 200	20
US Top Christian Albums (Billboard)	2
US Digital Albums (Billboard)	7
