= Black ink (disambiguation) =

Black ink, or India ink or Chinese ink, is a simple black or colored ink once widely used for writing and printing and now more commonly used for drawing and outlining.

Black ink may also refer to:

- Black Ink, album by American rapper Prozak
- Black Ink, subcommittee of Black Student Movement at University of North Carolina at Chapel Hill, U.S.

== See also ==
- Ink
- Color printing
- Black Ink Crew, an American reality television series
- Cephalopod ink, a dark pigment released into water by most species of cephalopod
- Iron gall ink, a purple-black or brown-black ink
- White Ink, Black Ink, album by Wheat
- Black Ink Collective, a former British publishing company founded in 1978
