= Closer to Love =

Single by Mat Kearney

from the album City of Black & White
- Released: March 10, 2009
- Genre: Pop
- Length: 3:37
- Label: Aware, Columbia
- Songwriters: Mat Kearney, Robert Marvin, Josiah Bell

Mat Kearney singles chronology
"Breathe In, Breathe Out" (2007)	"Closer to Love" (2009)	"All I Have" (2009)

Music video
- "Closer to Love" on YouTube

"Closer to Love" is the first single from Mat Kearney's third album City of Black & White. It was released as a digital download on March 10, 2009. The song was featured in USA Today and chosen as the "Pick of the week." The music video was released on March 27, 2009.

Kearney explained to Relevant Magazine that this song is, "about dealing with the difficulties of a tough world, or maybe about the tough world we see our friends living in, or maybe it's something about the growing we are all a part of—longing for something whole and perfect—like we are just passing through this place."

On September 6, 2011, Taylor Swift covered this song on her Speak Now World Tour in Portland, Oregon at the Rose Garden Arena.

== Charts ==
=== Weekly charts ===
Chart performance for Closer to Love
Chart (2009)	Peak position
US Billboard Hot 100	91
US Adult Alternative Airplay (Billboard)	6
US Adult Contemporary (Billboard)	13
US Adult Pop Airplay (Billboard)	12
US Hot Christian Songs (Billboard)	7
US Christian Airplay (Billboard)	7

=== Year-end charts ===
Chart (2009)	Position
US Adult Contemporary (Billboard)	36
US Adult Top 40 (Billboard)	31

== Certifications ==
Region	Certification	Certified units/sales
United States (RIAA)	Gold	500,000^{‡}
^{‡} Sales+streaming figures based on certification alone.
