= RED Ink Records =

- Parent company: Sony Music Entertainment
- Founded: 1997
- Distributors: RED Distribution; Sony Music Entertainment
- Genre: Various
- Country of origin: United States

RED Ink Records is an American record label founded in 1997 and owned and co-distributed by Sony Music Entertainment, along with RED Distribution.

== Artists signed or recorded for RED Ink ==
- Jesca Hoop
- Nicky Wire
- Cage the Elephant
- Low vs Diamond
- MGMT
- G-Eazy
- The Rifles
- Brandi Carlile
- Say Anything
- Bebo Valdés
- Consequence
- Cradle of Filth
- Chucho Valdés
- Alex Blake
- Aberdeen City
- Blues Traveler
- Boys Like Girls
- Joe Satriani
- Manic Street Preachers
- Ari Hest
- Switchfoot
- The Perishers
- Rami Jaffee
- illScarlett
- Soulsavers
- Aqualung
- Kraak & Smaak
- Jaz Coleman
- Val Emmich
- Matt Squire
- Kaki King
- 19 Wheels
- Edreys
- The Fashion
