= Ships in the Night (Mat Kearney song) =

2011 single by Mat Kearney

Single by Mat Kearney

from the album Young Love
- Released: November 2011
- Genre: Pop
- Length: 4:15
- Label: Aware; Universal Republic
- Songwriter(s): Matt Kearney; Robert Marvin; Joshua Crosby; Jason Lehning
- Producer(s): Kearney; Lehning

Mat Kearney singles chronology
"Down" (2011)	"Ships in the Night" (2011)	"Heartbeat" (2014)

Music video
- "Ships in the Night" on YouTube

"Ships in the Night" is a song by American singer-songwriter Mat Kearney and the third single from his fourth studio album Young Love (2011). It was written by Kearney himself, Robert Marvin, Joshua Crosby and Jason Lehning and produced by Kearney and Lehning.

== Background ==
In an interview with SheKnows.com, Mat Kearney explained his inspiration behind the song:

Everything [on Young Love] was real. I had to have bled every lyric about my family or about my new marriage. "Ships in the Night" was a current song on the radio and that one — it took me a long time to write. All of the sudden, I got in this fight with my wife on the way to the airport or something and we weren't talking, and then I called her and we were like making up, and I remember pulling out my laptop and like taking notes on our conversation, like "What did you say again?" It just turned into a really cool, special song about two people trying to connect, and it's probably one of my favorite songs on the record.

== Composition ==
The song depicts the narrator in a troubled relationship that has been impacted by his traumatic childhood. It has been described as incorporating "Jason Mraz's hip-hop fusion".

== Charts ==
Chart (2011–2012)	Peak position
US Billboard Hot 100	87
US Adult Pop Songs (Billboard)	25
US Hot Christian Songs (Billboard)	31

== Certifications ==
Region	Certification	Certified units/sales
United States (RIAA)	Gold	500,000^{^}
^{^} Shipments figures based on certification alone.
