= Don't Play with Matches =

Studio album by Tabitha's Secret
- Released: 1997
- Recorded: 1993–1995
- Genre: Alternative rock; jangle pop; pop rock; power pop
- Length: 58:05
- Label: JTJ Records Inc.
- Producer: Jay Stanley; Tabitha's Secret

Tabitha's Secret chronology
| Don't Play with Matches (1997) | Live (1999) |

Don't Play with Matches is the debut album of the American Alternative rock band Tabitha's Secret. The tracks were recorded in 1993–1995, although the album was released in 1997. It is thought that it was released to capitalise on the popularity of Rob Thomas's next band Matchbox 20's album Yourself Or Someone Like You. The songs "3 A.M." and "Tired" were both rerecorded by Matchbox 20.

== Track listing ==
- All tracks are co-written by Thomas, Stanley, Goff and Yale
1. "3 A.M." (Rob Thomas, John Goff, Jay Stanley, Brian Yale) - 3:43
2. "Forever December" - 5:58
3. "Here Comes Horses" - 4:26
4. "Paint Me Blue" - 4:58
5. "Dear Joan" - 4:51
6. "High" - 4:40
7. "Unkind" - 3:29
8. "Jesus Was An Alien" - 4:37
9. "Tired" - 3:58
10. "Swing" - 3:53
11. "3 A.M." (Rob Thomas, John Goff, Jay Stanley, Brian Yale) - 3:47
12. "Forever December" - 4:32
13. "Dizzy (hidden track)" - 5:08

== Credits ==
Rob Thomas - Lead Vocals, Piano
John Goff - Background Vocals, Guitar
Jay Stanley - Background Vocals, Guitar
Brian Yale - Bass Guitar
Paul Doucette - Drums/Percussion
Engineered and Mixed by Dana Cornock, Dave Bell and Jay Stanley
Mastered by Dana Cornock
Concept by Jay Stanley
Photography by Dominic Casale
