= Mile (band) =

American alternative rock band

- Mile, 2000.

Background information
- Origin: Tallahassee, Florida, United States
- Genres: Alternative rock
- Years active: 1998–2003
- Labels: Columbia Records; Aware Records
- Past members: Noel Hartough; David Lareau; Marlin Clark; Davy Mason; Stan Turner

Mile was a five-piece alternative rock band from Tallahassee, Florida, active in the late 1990s and early 2000s. They are best known for the single "Back to the Floor" and its corresponding MTV music video, as well as the song "Perfect Ending", which was featured in the film Saving Silverman.

== History ==
Mile was formed in 1998, in Tallahassee, Florida, by singer/songwriter Noel Hartough. Hartough played regularly on the local club circuit, gaining the attention of then Creed manager, Jeff Hanson. Hanson convinced Hartough to try and make a career of music.

Hartough, who had previously released music on Aware Records and Deep South Records, was then introduced, by Hanson, to multi-platinum producer John Kurzweg. The two soon entered the studio together and recorded several demos, a couple of which ended up in rotation on local radio. The strength of that material led to a publishing contract, major label record deal, and ultimately, creation of the band "Mile".

The band's lineup consisted of Noel Hartough, David Lareau, Stan Turner, Marlin Clark and Davy Mason. (The addition of Marlin Clark and Davy Mason was quite notable in its own right at the time, as the duo had just come from the Atlantic Records band Mighty Joe Plum, and had scored a Top 6 hit on rock radio just prior to joining "Mile".)

== Major label release ==
Following a record label showcase in New York, Mile signed to Columbia Records in 1999. They released the album Driving Under Stars on Aug. 29th 2000, with the lead single "Back To The Floor" being sent to rock radio in both the United States and Canada. The record was produced by Malcolm Springer (Matchbox 20, Collective Soul, Full Devil Jacket) and mixed by noted engineer Chris Lord-Alge (Stone Temple Pilots, Seether, 3 Doors Down). The album was greeted with mixed, though mostly positive, reviews. It landed at #8 in PopMatters "Best of 2000" with Billboard (magazine) noting the "Lushly layered, guitar driven arrangement", Allmusic calling it a "Promising first effort" and The Indianapolis Star stating that "Hartough is adept at crafting songs that build". On the tone of the record, AOL stated "If R.E.M. was a Southern band that never really seemed Southern except in its mood of stately dislocation, Mile is more overtly Southern, but still touched with an alienation that is particular to Hartough's world view." The music video for the single "Back To The Floor" was placed in rotation on MTV2 and MuchMusic.

== Charts ==
Year	Title	Chart Positions	Album
Year	Title	Billboard 200	Album
2000	"Back To The Floor"	50	Driving Under Stars
