= Medeiros/Hope and Adams/30 Minute Theatrik (Scanning the Garden) =

Compilation album by Wheat
- Released: March 10, 2009
- Genre: indie rock
- Length: 1:54:06 (three discs)
- Label: The Rebel Group

This three-CD reissue of Wheat's first two albums includes a disc of rarities entitled 30 Minute Theatrik (Scanning the Garden). It was released in early 2009.

== Track listing ==
Medeiros (1997)

1. "Preprise" – 1:30
2. "Death Car" – 3:19
3. "Karmic Episodes" – 3:22
4. "Tubesoft" – 3:44
5. "Soft Polluted Blacks" – 4:08
6. "Summer" – 6:46
7. "Leslie West" – 4:13
8. "Girl Singer" – 4:35
9. "Working Man's Manifesto" – 4:42
10. "Reprise" – 1:09

Hope and Adams (1999)

1. "This Wheat" – 1:51
2. "Slow Fade" – 1:39
3. "Don't I Hold You" – 3:50
4. "Raised Ranch Revolution" – 4:41
5. "San Diego" – 2:51
6. "No One Ever Told Me" – 2:16
7. "Be Brave" – 4:17
8. "Who's the One" – 4:40
9. "Off the Pedestal" – 3:11
10. "And Someone With Strengths" – 3:50
11. "Body Talk [Part 1]" – 2:35
12. "Body Talk [Part 2]" – 3:08
13. "More Than You'll Ever Know" – 2:52
14. "Roll the Road" – 2:11

30 Minute Theatrik (Scanning the Garden) (2009)

1. "30 Minute Intro/We Will Rock" – 2:59
2. "The Closer I Get 2 U" – 2:21
3. "Long Shadow, U.S.A." – 4:37
4. "Heaven Has" – 5:11
5. "Slow Roads" – 3:36
6. "Intermission" – 0:29
7. "Test Tones" – 3:22
8. "New Boyfriend" – 2:52
9. "I've Walked Away From Things a Lot Bigger Than This" – 3:12
10. "Theme Mavaras" – 3:50
11. "Show Stopper" – 0:18

All songs written by Wheat. Mastered by Eric Baird at Half Son of Audio (Attleboro, Mass.). Track notes: 1) "Girl voice by Sara Søvsø Szocska Hansen, recorded by Kenny Nielsen (sp?)"; "We Will Rock" mixed by Brian Deck at Clava (Chicago, Ill.); 2) recorded and mixed by Dave Auchenbach at Pain and Pleasure (Providence, R.I.); 3) recorded by Auchenbach, mixed by Deck; 4) from the vinyl edition of Medeiros; recorded by Auchenbach, mixed by Deck; 5) demo recorded by Wheat at home; 6) audio of Bob Dubrow of WMBR (Cambridge, Mass.) "waiting for Wheat"; 7) demo for the Flaming Lips recorded by Wheat at home; 8) recorded by Wheat at home; 9) recorded and mixed by Rick Lescault at Electric Ali (Fairhaven, Mass.); 10) demo by Kenneth Madaras.
