= Hope and Adams =

Studio album by Wheat
- Released: October 26, 1999
- Genre: Indie rock, lo-fi
- Length: 43:52
- Label: Sugar Free Records
- Producer: Dave Fridmann, Dave Auchenbach, and Wheat

Wheat chronology
Medeiros (1997)	Hope and Adams (1999)	Per Second, Per Second, Per Second ... Every Second (2003)

Professional ratings
Review scores
Source	Rating
AllMusic	3.5/5 stars
Robert Christgau	(3-star Honorable Mention)
Pitchfork Media	7.6/10

Hope and Adams is the second full-length album by Wheat. It was released in the fall of 1999, and reissued almost a decade later.

== Track listing ==
All songs written by Wheat (Ricky Brennan Jr., Brendan Harney, and Scott Levesque).

1. "This Wheat" – 1:51
2. "Slow Fade" – 1:39
3. "Don't I Hold You" – 3:50
4. "Raised Ranch Revolution" – 4:41
5. "San Diego" – 2:51
6. "No One Ever Told Me" – 2:16
7. "Be Brave" – 4:17
8. "Who's the One" – 4:40
9. "Off the Pedestal" – 3:11
10. "And Someone With Strengths" – 3:50
11. "Body Talk [Part 1]" – 2:35
12. "Body Talk [Part 2]" – 3:08
13. "More Than You'll Ever Know" – 2:52
14. "Roll the Road" – 2:11
15. "Flat Black" – 3:20 (Australian bonus track)
16. "Headphone Recorder" – 3:04 (Australian bonus track)
17. "New Boyfriend" – 2:52 (Australian bonus track)

== Personnel ==
Recorded and mixed by Dave Fridmann (assistant engineer: Michael Ivins) at Tarbox Road Studios (Cassadaga, N.Y.); additional recording by Dave Auchenbach at Pain and Pleasure (Providence, R.I.); more recording by Wheat at home. Mastered by Jeff Lipton at Peerless Mastering (Allston, Mass.). Additional playing by Fridmann and Jim Briggs III.
