= Tabitha's Secret? =

Studio album by Tabitha's Secret
- Released: January 1, 2001
- Genre: Alternative rock; Pop rock; Power pop
- Length: 43:44
- Label: JTJ Records Inc.
- Producer: Jay Stanley; Tabitha's Secret

Tabitha's Secret chronology
Live (1999)	Tabitha's Secret? (2001)	The Vault, Vol. 1 (2007)

Tabitha's Secret is the second studio album by the American Alternative rock band Tabitha's Secret. The album was released in 2001.

== Track listing ==
- All tracks are written by Tabitha's Secret Rob Thomas, Jay Stanley, John Goff, Brian Yale and ***Paul Doucette
1. "And Around" - 3:42
2. "Unkind" - 3:21
3. "Here Comes Horses" - 4:23
4. "Dear Joan" - 4:57
5. "Forever December" - 4:49
6. "Tired" - 3:58
7. "Paint Me Blue" - 4:14
8. "Swing" - 3:55
9. "Dizzy" - 3:48
10. "3 A.M. (Acoustic)" - 3:46
11. "Blue Monday" - 2:51

== Credits ==
- Rob Thomas – Lead Vocals, Piano
- John Goff – Background Vocals, Guitar
- Jay Stanley – Background Vocals, Guitar
- Brian Yale – Bass Guitar, Occasional Percussion
- Chris Smith and Paul Doucette – Drums/Percussion
- Kays Al-Atrakcchi – Additional Keyboards
- Engineered and Mixed by – Dave Bell, Mark Cross, John Goff and Jay Stanley
