= Wheat (band) =

American band

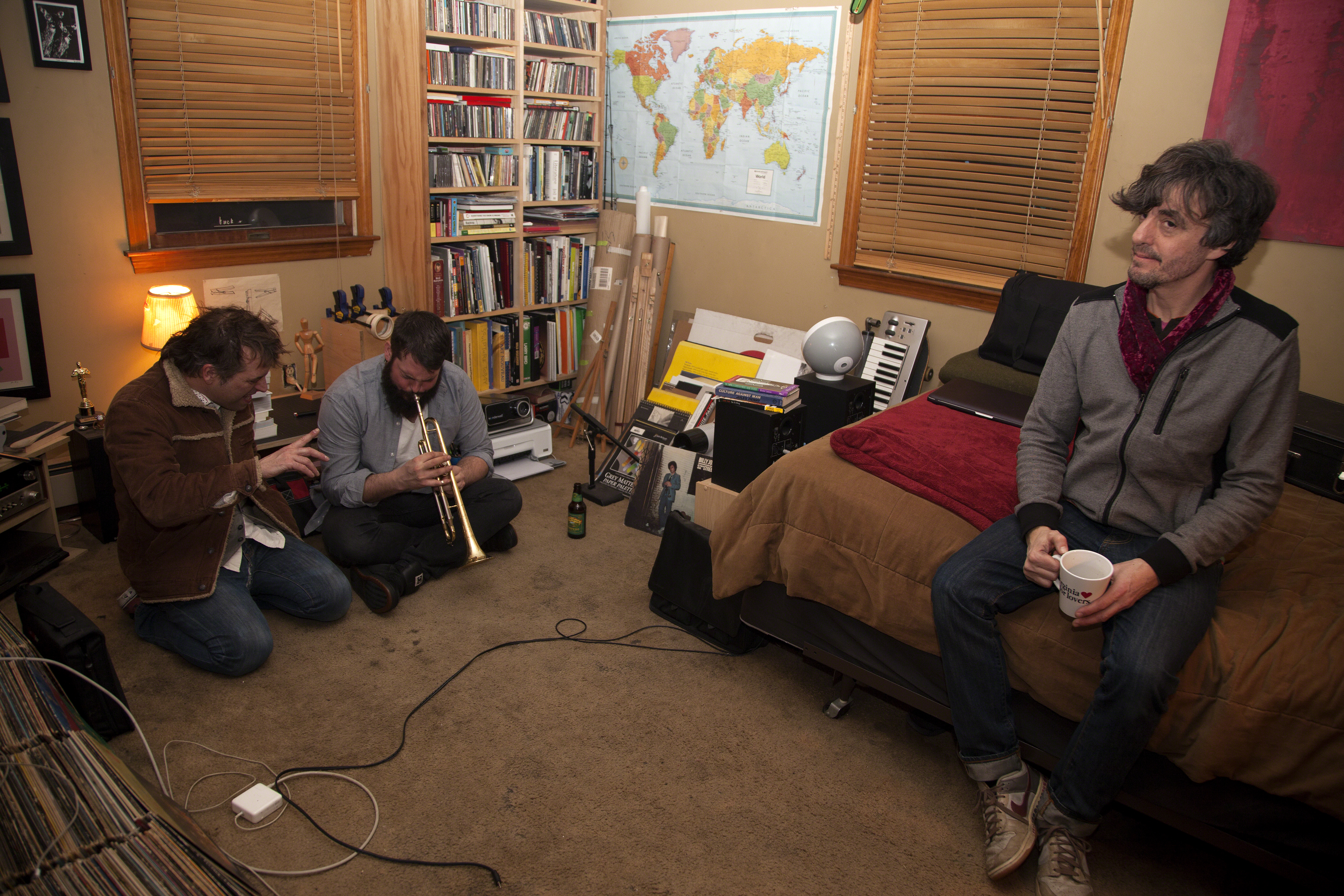
- Wheat (left-right: Scott Levesque, Luke Hebert, Brendan Harney), January 26, 2014

Background information
- Origin: Taunton, Massachusetts, United States
- Genres: Indie rock, indie pop, lo-fi
- Years active: 1996-present
- Labels: Sugar Free, Aware, Empyrean, The Rebel Group, Shorebird
- Members: Luke Hebert; Scott Levesque
- Past members: Brendan Harney; Ricky Brennan Jr.; Kenny Madaras

Wheat is an American indie rock band formed by Scott Levesque (vocals, guitar), Brendan Harney (drums, vocals), Ricky Brennan Jr. (guitar, vocals), and Kenny Madaras (bass) in Taunton, Massachusetts, in 1996.

== History ==
Wheat's debut album, Medeiros, released in 1997 on Sugar Free Records, was recorded by Dave Auchenbach and mixed by Red Red Meat's Brian Deck. Madaras left the group—and was never permanently replaced on bass—prior to the release of their second Sugar Free album, 1999's Hope and Adams, which was produced by Dave Fridmann at Tarbox Road Studios in Cassadaga, New York (the single "Don't I Hold You" ranked 50th on John Peel's Festive Fifty chart for BBC Radio 1 in 1999).

The group left Sugar Free and signed with London-based Nude Records in 2000, but the label folded soon after. Wheat continued writing, however, and in 2002, after two years of record-business limbo, they signed with Aware Records, which had a distribution deal with Columbia. Two of the songs recorded for the unfinished Nude incarnation of Wheat's third album, Per Second, Per Second, Per Second ... Every Second, survived as so-called "naked" versions on the 2003 sampler EP Too Much Time, while others were rerecorded for the Aware-sanctioned edition of Per Second, also released in 2003. The track "Some Days" was included in the film Win a Date With Tad Hamilton!, "I Met a Girl" appeared in A Cinderella Story, and the 2003 version of "Don't I Hold You" was featured in Elizabethtown.

After promoting Per Second in 2003 and 2004 by touring with Liz Phair, Toad the Wet Sprocket, and Blake Babies and performing on Late Night with Conan O'Brien and Last Call with Carson Daly, only to see the album sell an underwhelming 30,000 copies, Wheat decided to take a break. Brennan departed near the end of 2004 to form Duresse, which self-released the EP Elate in early 2006.

Later that year, Wheat, now a duo, finished writing and recording their fourth album, Everyday I Said a Prayer for Kathy and Made a One Inch Square, with Rick Lescault at Electric Ali Studios in Fairhaven, Massachusetts. Preceded by the EP That's Exactly What I Wanted ... Exactly That in early 2007, the album was released by Empyrean Records in May. (Aware Records never officially dropped Wheat from its roster. However, it declined its option to release the follow-up to Per Second.) An EP titled Move = Move, featuring exclusive tracks and multimedia content, was set for release in February 2008 but was pulled at the last minute for undisclosed reasons, causing frustration for fans who had preordered the disc. Wheat ended its association with Empyrean soon after.

In early 2009 Wheat announced on their website and MySpace page that Medeiros and Hope and Adams would be reissued in March by the Rebel Group label as part of a three-CD deluxe package that included a bonus disc of outtakes and rarities entitled 30 Minute Theatrik (Scanning the Garden). The band then completed their fifth studio album, White Ink, Black Ink, which the Rebel Group released that July.

Wheat notified their fans in September 2011 that it would be releasing three singles in the coming months in advance of a new album. The Used 2 Be in Love Blues, featuring the title track and "House of Kiss," was first up, followed three months later by Gettin' Ready To, which includes the B-side "Feel Good Co." In April 2012 P Is for Pressure (B-side: "We Won't Be Satisfied") completed the set. All three singles feature hand-screened artwork by Luke Hebert, who became a member of Wheat around 2007.

In June 2013 the band released another new song, "Black Days Away," as a free download on their website, and announced that their sixth LP was officially under way. Eleven months later they revealed that the multimedia company Shorebird would be reissuing their first album, Medeiros, on vinyl and CD in addition to releasing Wishing Good Things for the World, a three-part project that would include a seven-song EP, a feature-length documentary, and Wheat's first new album since 2009.

However, by October 2014 the band had asked Shorebird to refund all preorders for the CD version of the EP, originally set to be released two months earlier, due to distribution-related delays; in its place, Wheat offered a free digital download to those customers of the EP's seven songs. The band followed up in March 2015 with an offer to mail physical copies of the CD's planned artwork at no charge, while the digital version of the EP became available for purchase on Wheat's website that same month. The band has had little activity since 2016.

Wheat's drummer, Brendan Harney, died on February 3, 2025.

== Discography ==
Studio albums

- Medeiros (1997)
- Hope and Adams (1999)
- Per Second, Per Second, Per Second... Every Second (2003)
- Everyday I Said a Prayer for Kathy and Made a One Inch Square (2007)
- White Ink, Black Ink (2009)

== See also ==
- Aware Records
