= Live (Tabitha's Secret album) =

Live album by Tabitha's Secret
- Released: 1999
- Recorded: 1994–1995
- Genre: Alternative rock Post-grunge; Pop rock Power pop
- Length: 55:00
- Label: JTJ Records Inc.

Tabitha's Secret chronology
Don't Play with Matches (1997)	Live (1999)	Tabitha's Secret? (2001)

Live is a live album by the American Alternative rock band Tabitha's Secret. The album was released in 1999.

== Track listing ==
1. "Million Miles" - 5:37
2. "Paint Me Blue" - 4:49
3. "Just Plain Tired" - 4:23
4. "This Is Not A Love Song" - 4:06
5. "Unkind" - 3:30
6. "High" - 4:38
7. "Jesus Was An Alien" - 4:43
8. "Here Comes Horses" - 4:39
9. "Loss, Strain & Butterflies" - 3:17
10. "3 A.M." - 3:55
11. "Forever December" - 6:34
12. "Dear Joan" - 5:27
