= Dovetail Joint (band) =

American rock band

- Byrne, Dapier, Kooker, and Gladfelter

Background information
- Origin: Chicago, Illinois, United States
- Genre: Alternative rock
- Years active: 1992–2002, 2023-Present
- Labels: Columbia Records; Aware Records
- Members: Joe Dapier; Robert Byrne; Charles Gladfelter
- Website: dovetailjoint.com

Dovetail Joint is a rock band that formed in Chicago, Illinois in 1992. The band originally featured guitar/vocalist Charles Gladfelter, guitarist Robert Byrne, bassist Jon Kooker, and drummer Joe Dapier. After independently releasing their self-titled album in 1995, the band started to garner interest locally and beyond. When their song "Level on the Inside" was featured as the first track on 'Local 101, vol. 1,' an annual compilation disc released by local alternative radio station WKQX Q101 in 1998, Columbia Records quickly signed the band and released their second album 001 in early 1999. "Level" turned out to be the band's only commercial hit, and Columbia dropped the band. Their third album, 'The Killing of Cool,' was recorded for Columbia Records, but never released.

After a 20-year hiatus, Dapier, Byrne, and Gladfelter reunited to write and record the band's fourth album, which musically picks up where 'The Killing of Cool' left off. That album, "Keep the Vultures Fed," was produced and mixed by Gladfelter and released on Bandcamp on May 20, 2024.

== History ==
=== Early days (1992–1996) ===
Dapier and Gladfelter started playing music together in middle school in Wilmette, IL in the 1980s and later formed a band as students at New Trier High School. Gladfelter attended college at the University of Iowa for two years before dropping out to pursue a career in music in 1991. That same year, Dapier transferred from where he was attending school at the University of Dayton in Ohio to Lake Forest College so that they could pursue the band together in Chicago. Dovetail Joint's first show was at the Vic Theater on August 14, 1992. The band's lineup was Chuck Gladfelter (guitar, vocals), Joe Dapier (drums), and Solomon Snyder (bass). Robert Byrne, who later became the band's rhythm guitarist, was in the audience at that show. According to a 1999 interview with Gladfelter, the band's name has no meaning: "It's a band name. It's obtuse. There's no significance. I guess we could have called ourselves Kleenex or toothpaste." In 1994, Robert Byrne joined the band as rhythm guitarist.

In April 1995, they entered Chicago's Warzone Studios with producer/engineer Scott Ramsayer and recorded their self-titled debut, later known as The Black Album. They tracked 15 songs and their friend Jack Buck agreed to finance the project under the name Buckshot Records.

The band attracted attention from record labels twice in their early years, which did not result in a signing. One was from producer Glen Ballard, who was starting his own label called Java Records. The band was scheduled to fly to Los Angeles to record with Ballard in 1997, but Java cancelled the session before it could take place.

Around this time, Solomon's brother, Matt Walker (drummer, Filter, Garbage, Morrissey, among others), and two other friends formed a band called Cupcakes. Solomon left the Joint to play bass with Cupcakes, who signed soon after with DreamWorks Records. Dovetail Joint needed a new bass player, and Scott Tallarida filled in.

=== Aware, Columbia, and "Level on the Inside" (1997–1999) ===
In 1997, local independent label Aware Records, which had recently signed a deal with Columbia Records, included the band on the label's annual compilation of unsigned bands, Aware 5 (1997). The track chosen for the compilation was a demo version of "This is My Home," produced by Scott Tallarida. In February 1998, Aware and manager Roger Jansen convinced the group to sign a publishing deal with EMI, and soon after, the band began working with producer John Fields.

During this time, Scott Tallarida was still playing bass, but indicated that he wanted to pursue his own musical aspirations. The second replacement was Mick Vaughn, producer of early Dovetail Joint recordings. Vaughn only performed one Joint show and then moved to North Carolina. However, in January 1998, he played bass for the first John Fields session at the producer's Minneapolis studio, Funkytown, where the band wrote the song "Level on the Inside." Kooker began rehearsing on bass with the band in 1998, joining officially in the fall of that year.

The band soon signed with Columbia Records and continued working with Fields. In the spring of 1998, Jansen and Latterman worked out an arrangement with Columbia Records where the band would release an EP exclusively with Aware prior to their major label debut on Columbia/Aware. That May, Chicago alternative radio station Q101 sought submissions from local bands for their first annual compilation CD: Local 101. "Level on the Inside" was chosen to be the first track of 18 songs on the disc and would receive hundreds of spins at Q101 that summer. The song was soon picked up by other radio stations in the Midwest, and led to the band selling out shows at Chicago venues House of Blues and Metro. Aware pushed forward the EP's release to respond to the growing interest; the six-track Level EP was released by Aware in September 1998.

On January 26, 1999, Columbia Records/Aware Records released Dovetail Joint's major label debut, 001. The album, produced by Fields and mixed by Jack Joseph Puig, had sold 16,000 copies by May. Nationally, "Level on the Inside" started experiencing the same success it continued to enjoy in Chicago. The song reached #38 on the Billboard Mainstream Rock chart in early 1999, and #17 on the Modern Rock Tracks chart, where it stayed for 13 weeks. Columbia agreed to produce a video for "Level on the Inside", directed by Phil Harder.

Following the video shoot, the band returned to the road for several months of touring in support of the album and single. Having a radio single earned the band opening slots on U.S. tours with bands such as The Marvelous 3 and Train. The Joint also did two-week stints with the Goo Goo Dolls, Cheap Trick, Collective Soul, and Ben Folds Five. Other shows included playing with The Black Crowes, Silverchair, Everclear, Blink 182, Third Eye Blind, Eve 6, and Local H. Robert Byrne was profiled in Guitar Player magazine in June 1999.

In April 1999, "Beautiful" was chosen as Dovetail Joint's second single; Chris Lord-Alge remixed the song at his Los Angeles studio. Touring continued until September 1999. The band returned to Chicago and began writing their follow-up effort.

=== Later years and breakup (2000–2010) ===
In late 1999, the band wrote 30 songs slated for the tentatively titled Killing of Cool album. The album was produced by Fields and optioned by Columbia, but a strain between the label and the band led to the group's departure from Columbia/Aware before it was officially released. It remains under lock and key in the Columbia Records vault.

On January 15, 2002, E.P. from the Underclass was released. The band broke up later that year.

On August 14, 2010, Dovetail Joint reunited to play a sold-out show at Lincoln Hall in Chicago.

On May 20, 2024, the band independently released a surprise new album entitled Keep The Vultures Fed. The 10-song album reunited Dapier, Byrne, and Gladfelter, was produced by Gladfelter, and was mastered by Dave McNair. The cover art was created by Jason Lee. The album is available on Bandcamp and other streaming platforms.

=== Other Projects (2002-2025) ===
In 2003, Charles Gladfelter and Robert Byrne regrouped to form the band Ivory Wire along with drummer Henry Jansen. The band has released two albums to date and remains on indefinite hiatus.

Dapier has played drums in the Chicago bands Plura, Imperial Mountain Villa, The Errol Flynns, and Smush. He has contributed drum tracks to numerous albums and recording projects, including "The Power of Sound" by Jonny Polonsky (2024) and new music by singer-guitarist Newt Cole, his bandmate from Plura, to be released in 2025.

== Official discography ==
=== Studio albums ===
Date of Release	Title	Record label
September 1, 1995	Dovetail Joint (The Black album)	Buckshot
January 26, 1999	001	Columbia
May 20, 2024	Keep The Vultures Fed	Independently released

=== Demo albums ===
Date of Release	Title	Record label
Unknown	Dovetail Joint (The White album)	Unknown
1998	The White Lab Coat Experiment	N/A
2001	The Killing of Cool Disc 1 & 2	Columbia

=== Extended plays ===
Date of Release	Title	Record label
September 8, 1998	The Level EP	Aware
January 15, 2002	E.P. From the Underclass	Cornerstone Productions
