= Gregg Latterman =

American Entrepreneur

- Born: 1967 (age 58–59); Lansing, Michigan
- Education: Michigan State University; Northwestern University Kellogg School of Management; University of Pennsylvania
- Occupations: Entrepreneur, academic, investor
- Years active: 1990-present
- Employer: Zell Lurie Institute for Entrepreneurship at Stephen M. Ross School of Business at the University of Michigan (executive director)
- Organizations: The Nantucket Project; Zell Scholars, Kellogg School of Business, Northwestern
- Known for: Founder and CEO, Aware Records

Gregg Latterman is an American entrepreneur, academic, and angel investor. The founder of Aware Records, he is the executive director of the Zell Lurie Institue for Entrepreneurship and clinical assistant professor of entrepreneurial studies at the University of Michigan. He was previously an adjunct professor at Northwestern University and adjunct lecturer at Kellogg School of Management.

Latterman put together a compilation CD of his favorite unsigned bands in 1993. He released it on his own label, and quit his job as a CPA the day it came out. The label, Aware, became "one of the most durable and influential independent forces in music," with Latterman helping to launch the careers of artists including John Mayer, Train, Mat Kearney, Hootie & The Blowfish, and Five For Fighting.

In 2012, after more than 25 million records were sold on Aware, Latterman decided to return to school. He attended the University of Pennsylvania, and earned a master's degree in positive psychology under Martin Seligman. He was an adjunct professor at Northwestern University Farley Center for Entrepreneurship and Innovation.

== Early life and education ==
Latterman was raised in East Lansing, Michigan. The son of a lawyer and a teacher, he snow skied and water skied throughout his childhood, and competed in both in high school and college. A music fan, he made mixtapes for friends, who would in return send him CDs by independent bands. Latterman was also interested in business, and read magazines such as Forbes and Business Week as a teenager.

Latterman attended Northern Michigan University on a partial athletic scholarship. He transferred to Michigan State in 1987 and graduated in 1990 with a degree in accounting. In 1996, Latterman received an MBA in marketing from the Kellogg School of Management at Northwestern University, and in 2013 earned a master's degree in Positive Psychology from the University of Pennsylvania.

== Career ==
=== 1990-1995: Launch of Aware Records, early success ===
After receiving his accounting degree, Latterman moved to Boston. He worked as a CPA at Coopers & Lybrand, a job he actively disliked, leading him to apply to MBA programs. He made mixtapes of unsigned bands who had developed a local following, selecting his favorite songs, and in early 1993 decided to produce a compilation album. Based on his own experience, he thought people from one city or state would buy a record to hear bands they already knew, and would be introduced to bands from other areas. Latterman learned the mechanics of making a CD and took out a $10,000 loan, and in 1993, working out of his apartment, he founded Madaket Records and put together Aware 1, a compilation CD of unsigned artists. On the day the album was released, he quit his job and moved to Vail, Colorado, where he coached the Vail Mountain ski team and developed strategies to promote the CD. Peter Margasak of the Chicago Reader later wrote that Latterman "knew little about the music industry when he came to it, but instead of dutifully learning and following its protocols, he developed his own."

Latterman gave the bands included on the compilation posters and copies of the album, which they sold on tour, and gave free CDs and posters to retailers as an incentive. He created an Aware store, which first sold albums directly to consumers through an 800 number, and later at retail outlets through a national distributor. Among other marketing efforts, he built grassroots campaigns through street teams and bought targeted local advertising. Aware 1 ultimately sold more than 30,000 albums, and Latterman began working on a second compilation, changing the name of the label to Aware.

As he prepared to release Aware 2, Latterman was accepted to the MBA program at Northwestern's Kellogg School of Management. He moved to Evanston, Illinois, and as a full-time student, he continued to build Aware Records. Aware 2, released in 1995, featured songs from artists who would go on to achieve significant success, including Better Than Ezra, The Verve Pipe, Vertical Horizon, Hootie & the Blowfish, and the Edwin McCain Band. Latterman became known for his ability to find and develop unsigned bands; within the music industry, an appearance on an Aware compilation was a "seal of approval, signifying an act worth pursuing."

=== 1996-2000: Aware/Columbia, A Squared Management ===
Latterman received his MBA in 1996. Aware had a staff of eight and an office in Chicago; it had released the third Aware compilation—which included a track from Tabitha's Secret, the precursor to Matchbox 20—and produced the first Aware Tour. The company had put out full-length albums by Stir and Thanks to Gravity, and had set up one of the first online music stores, as well as a traveling store with the exclusive right to sell CDs on the H.O.R.D.E. Tour. Latterman had also served as an A&R consultant for Atlantic (in 1995) and MCA (in 1996).

In 1997, Aware and Columbia Records launched a joint venture that provided distribution for Aware's developing artists through RED, Sony's independent distribution arm, while at the same time serving as a "farm team" for Columbia—at a certain sales threshold, releases were moved to the Aware/Columbia imprint and marketed through Columbia. In 1998, Aware/RED released Train's self-titled platinum debut.,

In 1999, Latterman founded A Squared Management. A Squared managed artists including Liz Phair, The Fray, Brandi Carlile, Michelle Branch, Motion City Soundtrack, Jack's Mannequin, Rachel Platten, Five For Fighting, and Mat Kearney. As The Fray's manager, Latterman worked with ABC to use The Fray's "How to Save a Life" on Grey's Anatomy, a placement that "catapulted the Denver band into another stratosphere, making its debut one of the best-selling albums of 2006."

=== 2000-2010: John Mayer, Five for Fighting, The Fray ===
In 2000, Latterman was sent an EP of John Mayer. He included two of Mayer's songs on Aware 8, and in early 2001, Aware released Mayers debut album, Room for Squares, as an internet-only album. It was re-released on Columbia in September, and went on to sell more than 5 million albums. Mayer was one of three Aware artists to receive Grammy nominations in 2002; Train was nominated for the album Drops of Jupiter, and Five for Fighting was nominated for their song "Superman (It's Not Easy)." Mayer won Best Male Pop Vocal Performance for "Your Body is a Wonderland." The ninth Aware compilation was released in January 2002; it was followed in October by a 14-song Greatest Hits collection.

Aware/Universal Republic released more than 50 records in partnership with Columbia; in addition to multiple hit records from Train, Mayer, and Five for Fighting, the label had significant success with Guster, The Thorns, and Mat Kearney. In 2010, with more than 25 million records sold over the 15-year period of the joint venture, Aware entered into a new distribution agreement with Universal Republic.

=== 2010-present: Northwestern, Zell Lurie Institute for Entrepreneurship ===
As the Universal Republic agreement was built, Latterman realized that the day-to-day business of running the label limited his ability to be creative; rather than finding music and mentoring artists, he was focused on logistics and crisis control. In 2012, at 45, he enrolled at the University of Pennsylvania, where, as a student of Martin Seligman, he earned a master's degree in positive psychology.

Latterman began teaching at Northwestern shortly after he received his degree. In addition to teaching Positive Entrepreneurship: Profits and Meaning, he created and taught a class titled NUvention: Entrepreneurship for the Arts. He also served as program lead for the Zell Fellows New Venture Track, a venture accelerator program.

He was named executive director of Zell Lurie Institute for Entrepreneurship at the Ross School of Business at the University of Michigan in 2024. The Zach Bryan concert that took place at the school's football stadium in September 2025 was Latterman's idea, and he facilitated the August 2024 conversations between the school's athletics department and promoter Anschutz Entertainment Group. The concert was the first held in the stadium since it was built in 1927. More than 112,000 tickets were sold. It was the largest ticketed single concert event in US history.

== Personal life ==
Latterman lives in Chicago, with his wife, Sue, and their three children. He is on the advisory board for the Nantucket Project and a member of the US Soccer Development Council.
