= Nothing Left to Lose (song) =

Single by Mat Kearney

from the album Nothing Left to Lose
- Released: May 2006
- Recorded: 2006
- Genre: Pop rock, soft rock
- Length: 4:24 (Album Version); 3:55 (Radio Edit)
- Label: Columbia
- Songwriter: Mat Kearney
- Producers: Robert Marvin; Mat Kearney

Mat Kearney singles chronology
"Nothing Left to Lose" (2006)	"Undeniable" (2007)

"Nothing Left to Lose" is a song by American artist Mat Kearney. It was released in May 2006 as the lead single from major-label debut of the same name. The song charted number 21 on the Billboard Hot Adult Contemporary Tracks and peaked on the Billboard Hot 100 at number 41 . The single was certified gold on November 6, 2007.

== Charts ==
=== Weekly charts ===
Weekly chart performance for "Nothing Left to Lose"
Chart (2006–07)	Peak position
Canada AC (Billboard)	49
Canada Hot AC (Billboard)	19
US Billboard Hot 100	41
US Adult Alternative Airplay (Billboard)	2
US Adult Contemporary (Billboard)	21
US Adult Pop Airplay (Billboard)	7
US Hot Christian Songs (Billboard)	21
US Pop Airplay (Billboard)	36

=== Year-end charts ===
Chart (2006)	Position
US Adult Top 40 (Billboard)	29
Chart (2007)	Position
US Adult Top 40 (Billboard)	24

== Certifications ==
Region	Certification	Certified units/sales
United States (RIAA)	Platinum	1,000,000^{‡}
^{‡} Sales+streaming figures based on certification alone.

== Awards ==
In 2007, the song was nominated for a Dove Award for Song of the Year at the 38th GMA Dove Awards.
