= Medeiros (album) =

Studio album by Wheat
- Released: October 28, 1997
- Genre: Indie rock, lo-fi
- Length: 37:28
- Label: Sugar Free Records
- Producer: Dave Auchenbach, Brian Deck, and Wheat

Wheat chronology
Medeiros (1997)	Hope and Adams (1999)

Professional ratings
Review scores
Source	Rating
Allmusic	3/5 stars

Medeiros is the debut album by Wheat. It was released in the fall of 1997 and reissued on CD in 2009 by the Rebel Group, then on vinyl in 2014 by Shorebird.

== Track listing ==
All songs written by Wheat (Ricky Brennan Jr., Brendan Harney, Scott Levesque, and Kenny Madaras).

1. "Preprise" – 1:30
2. "Death Car" – 3:19
3. "Karmic Episodes" – 3:22
4. "Tubesoft" – 3:44
5. "Soft Polluted Blacks" – 4:08
6. "Summer" – 6:46
7. "Leslie West" – 4:13
8. "Girl Singer" – 4:35
9. "Working Man's Manifesto" – 4:42
10. "Reprise" – 1:09

== Production notes ==
Recorded by Dave Auchenbach at Pain and Pleasure (Providence, Rhode Island), by Brian Deck at Kingsize (Chicago, Illinois), and by Wheat at home. Mixed by Deck at Kingsize; mastered by Alan Douches at West West Side (New Windsor, New York). Additional playing by Deck and Tony Amaral.
