= 19 Wheels =

- Origin: Michigan, United States
- Genres: Hard rock; alternative rock
- Years active: 1990-2005
- Past members: Chris Johnston; Scott Owens; Tim Marzorati; Rob Dickey

19 Wheels was an American alternative rock band from East Lansing, Michigan. It was founded by Chris Johnston (vocals, guitar), Scott Owens (guitar), Tim Marzorati (bass); drummer Rob Dickey joined in 2000.

== History ==
The group was initially known as Hannibals before changing their name to Nineteen Wheels.

The group first attracted attention with their 1996 EP, The Tempermill Recordings, which led to a spot touring on the ESPN Extreme Games Tour in 1996. They later signed to Aware Records for their 1997 release, Six Ways from Sunday. After Aware entered into a joint venture with Columbia, Six Ways from Sunday was reissued in an "amended version" in October 1997. This amended version featured an additional album track and was identified by the predominantly red cover, as opposed to the blue cover on the original release. In a review of the album, Allmusic noted, "The band maintains a muscular, tight sound throughout, thanks in large part to superb bass and drum work."

19 Wheels' album, Sugareen, was self-released, and was produced by another Michigan local, Donny Brown of the band Verve Pipe. It sold over 14,000 copies. They followed this up with the EP Jawbreaker in 2004, produced by Bob Ezrin.

While working with Ezrin, the group members questioned whether they would continue working together. By this time, several had wives and families, had taken steady jobs, and had moved to different parts of the state of Michigan; Owens and Marzorati were still living near Lansing, while Johnston had moved to Ferndale and Dickey to Grand Rapids. Late in 2005, they decided to break up, releasing one final EP and playing their final show on November 25, 2005 at The Intersection in Grand Rapids.

19 Wheels' track "Reactor" was featured on Ford's website for the new 2010 Ford Fusion.

== Members ==
- Chris Johnston - vocals, guitar
- Scott Owens - guitar
- Tim Marzorati - bass
- Rob Dickey - drums

== Discography ==
- The Tempermill Recordings (1996, EP, CD)
- Six Ways from Sunday - Aware Records (1997 LP, CD)
- Sugareen - Self released / Standard (2000 LP, CD)
- Jawbreaker - Self released / Standard (2004 LP, CD)
- This is the Life - Self released / Standard (2005 EP, CD)
