= Mat Kearney =

American musician (born 1978)

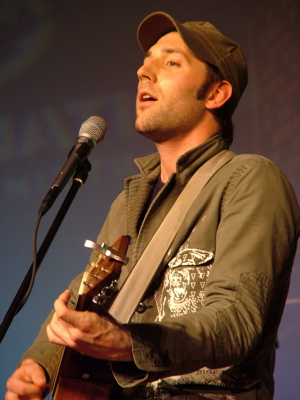

Background information
- Born: December 1, 1978 (age 47); Eugene, Oregon, U.S.
- Origin: Nashville, Tennessee, U.S.
- Genres: Soft rock; folk; CCM; hip hop
- Occupations: Singer, songwriter
- Instruments: Vocals, guitar, piano
- Years active: 2003–present
- Labels: InPop; Columbia; Aware; Universal Republic; Tomorrow Music
- Spouse: Annie Sims Kearney (m. 2010)
- Website: matkearney.com

Mathew William Kearney (/ˈkɑːrni/; born December 1, 1978) is an American musician born in Eugene, Oregon, and based in Nashville, Tennessee. He has a total of five top 20 hits on the Adult Top 40 Chart.

Just Kids was released on February 24, 2015. The album's first single, "Heartbeat", was released on November 4, 2014. Crazytalk was released on May 4, 2018, and January Flower was released on Jan 29, 2021.

== Biography ==
=== Early life ===
Kearney was born on December 1, 1978, and raised in Eugene, Oregon, with his two brothers. At South Eugene High School, Kearney was a soccer player.

He attended California State University, Chico on an athletic scholarship and majored in literature, playing soccer until his junior year. Kearney first became interested in music after traveling to Nashville with music producer Robert Marvin. Using a roommate's guitar, he tried covering songs by other artists, but realized he was not very good at it, and began writing his own. Though things were going well for Kearney at school, the partying atmosphere at Chico caught up to him. In an interview, Kearney said, "I guess I lived it up and did what everyone said you should do in college. I discovered the depth of depravity, the bleakness of that lifestyle. It just wasn't working. I finally started understanding there must be more to life."

Kearney began focusing on music fusing his simple guitar playing with spoken word or rap. He started to play at coffee shops and soon began to make small amounts of money. At this time, Kearney had met friend and future producer, Robert Marvin. The two began to make music together, but Marvin had plans to move to Nashville, Tennessee. Marvin asked Kearney to help with the move and he accepted. Kearney says, "I helped him pack up his trailer and we put a mattress on the back of his truck. We basically drove cross-country and slept in the back. When we pulled into Nashville we slept in a school parking lot for three days until we finally rented this apartment where the roof was caving in and mice were crawling all over." Kearney decided to stay in Nashville to record a few demos with Marvin and after a few months, Kearney had no plans on returning. "By the end of the summer, we had three or four songs and I realized this is what I wanted to do. It just clicked. So I called home to Oregon and said, 'I'm not coming back' and I never left Nashville."

=== Recording career ===
On April 18, 2006, Kearney's second album and major-label debut, titled Nothing Left to Lose, was released. It contains several reworked songs from Kearney's first album Bullet, as well as some new material, and has sold over 450,000 copies to date. The title track "Nothing Left to Lose" was the first single from the album, peaking at No. 41 on the Billboard Hot 100 for the week of February 10, 2007. The single has sold over 500,000 copies and won numerous BMI awards. The track "All I Need" was featured on Grey's Anatomy and NCIS. It peaked at No. 94 on the Billboard Pop 100. To promote Nothing Left to Lose, Kearney toured with John Mayer, Sheryl Crow, Train, Mutemath, Meiko, and Cary Brothers throughout 2005, '06, and '07; he also headlined VH1's first ever "You Oughta Know Tour" in early 2007.

Kearney's following album, City of Black & White, was released through Columbia Records on May 19, 2009. He collaborated with Nashville artists such as Trent Dabbs, Matthew Perryman Jones, Kate York, Paul Moak, Daniel James, Will Sayles, and Josiah Bell. Robert Marvin (tobyMac, Britt Nicole), the producer of Kearney's previous albums and EPs, joined him yet again. The lead single was "Closer To Love", and it received much airplay, on both secular and Christian outlets. His second single is "All I Have", the last song he wrote before releasing the album.

In May 2009, Kearney toured with Keane and The Helio Sequence for several weeks to promote City of Black & White. It debuted on the Billboard 200 at No. 13. He toured with Owl City and Unwed Sailor on Owl City's "All Things Bright and Beautiful Tour".

Young Love was released August 2, 2011. The album's first single, "Hey Mama", was released on May 10, 2011. "Hey Mama" charted in the Top 40 of Adult Pop Songs at No. 22. The second single "Down" charted as high as No. 23 on the Christian Songs chart. Just Kids, was released on February 24, 2015. The album's first single, "Heartbeat", was released on November 4, 2014. He toured with both Judah and the Lion and Parachute during his "Just Kids" tour in 2015.

From August 17, 2016, through November 12, 2016, Kearney toured with Needtobreathe for their second annual Tour de Compadres, where he performed songs from his albums Nothing Left to Lose, Young Love, and Just Kids.

On December 13, 2016, Kearney signed with independent music company Big Loud Mountain Management. On February 3, 2017, Kearney released a song with Filous, titled "Goodbye". Kearney released a self-titled EP on December 22, 2017, previewing new tracks from his forthcoming album, Crazy Talk.

Mat Kearney released his sixth album, Crazytalk, May 4, 2018, to average reviews. Kearney did a two-month long Crazytalk tour starting the third week of February 2018. The album's single, "Better Than I Used to be", released on November 10, 2017, and reached No. 27 on the Viral 50 chart.

To celebrate the ten year anniversary of his second album, The City of Black and White, Kearney released The City of Black and White Revisited EP in June 2019. He promoted the project with an acoustic concert tour beginning that Fall.

Kearney released his self-titled album on May 17, 2024 via Middle Kid Records.

In June 2026, Mat Kearney announced his new album Hanging by a Heartstring, set for release on October 9.

=== Band ===
- Mat Kearney – vocals, guitar, piano
- Chad Kinner – drums, percussion (2011–present)
- Fred Williams – piano, keys
- Adam Keafer – bass (2010–2015)
- Nathan Spicer – guitar (2010–present)
- Tyler Burkum – guitar, vocals (2009–present)
- Phil Moore – bass (2015–present)
- M.D. Miller – bass (2005–2009)
- Jeremy Lutito – drums (2009–2012)
- Aaron Farmer – keys (2016)

== Musical style ==
Kearney's music incorporates hip hop and folk-pop. A notable exception to this was on his third album The City of Black and White where the hip-hop element was downplayed with Kearney explaining that he was trying to make a "more mature, more adult contemporary" album with his next album though he would return to his normal mix of genres. He recalls that upon the release of his major label debut, "it got totally trashed by Rolling Stone because I was blending hip-hop stuff into my music." Inspired by his hero, Paul Simon, Kearney tries to make each of his albums have a distinct sound stating, "usually if I did one thing on one record, I tend to somewhat be the other extreme on the next one." The album Crazytalk notably features the inclusion of EDM into his music.

== Personal life ==
Kearney married his wife Annie in 2010 and currently resides in Nashville, Tennessee.

Kearney has stated that his legal name is Mathew due to a nurse's error on his birth certificate. He discovered the error while in the 8th grade when he noticed how his mother corrected the error with ink, never legally correcting it. Since then, he embraced the one "T" in his legal name.

On January 4, 2017, Kearney and his wife had their first child, a girl named Olive Sims Kearney. Their second daughter was born on March 25, 2020, and named Violet River Kearney. The couple welcomed their third daughter, Ruby Josephine Kearney, on March 28, 2022.

== Discography ==
=== Studio albums ===
Title	Details	Peak chart positions				Sales
Title	Details	US	US Christ.	US Rock	CAN	Sales
Bullet	Release date: October 19, 2004; Label: Inpop; Formats: CD, digital download	—	—	—	—	
Nothing Left to Lose	Release date: April 18, 2006; Label: Aware/Columbia; Formats: CD, digital download	109	4	—	—	
City of Black & White	Release date: May 19, 2009; Label: Aware/Columbia; Formats: CD, digital download	13	1	3	—	
Young Love	Release date: August 2, 2011; Label: Aware/Universal Republic; Formats: CD, digital download	4	1	1	20	US: 213,000
Just Kids	Release date: February 24, 2015; Label: Republic; Formats: CD, digital download	20	2	—	—	
Crazytalk	Release date: May 4, 2018; Label: Tomorrow Music; Formats: CD, digital download	60	—	—	—	
January Flower	Release date: May 21, 2021; Label: Tomorrow Music; Formats: CD, vinyl, digital download, streaming	— (Note: "January Flower" did not enter the Billboard 200, but peaked at No. 29 on the Top Album Sales chart.)	4	—	—	
Mat Kearney	Release date: May 15, 2024; Label: Middle Kid Records; Formats: CD, vinyl, digital download, streaming					
Still Drowning in Nostalgia	Release date: February 21, 2025; Label: Middle Kid; Formats: Digital download, streaming	TBA				
Hanging by a Heartstring	Release date: October 9, 2026; Label: Middle Kid; Formats: CD, vinyl, digital download, streaming	TBA				
"—" denotes releases that did not chart

=== Live albums ===
Title	Details
Until We Meet Again... (Live Unplugged)	Release date: October 9, 2020; Label: Tomorrow Music; Formats: LP, digital download

=== Extended plays ===
Title	Details	Peak chart positions				Sales
Title	Details	US	US Christ.	US Indie	US Rock	Sales
Revive Us	Released: 2002; Label: Independent	—	—	—	—	
West In November	Released: 2003; Label: Independent	—	—	—	—	
The Chicago EP	Released: 2005; Label: Aware/Columbia/Inpop	—	—	—	—	
Rhapsody Originals	Release date: February 20, 2007; Label: Aware/Columbia; Format: Digital download	—	—	—	—	
Acoustic Session (iTunes Exclusive)	Release date: April 17, 2007; Label: Aware; Format: Digital download	—	—	—	—	
Live Session (iTunes Exclusive)	Release date: December 8, 2009; Label: Aware; Format: Digital download	—	30	—	—	
Black Swan Shadow	Release date: 2010; Label: Aware; Format: Vinyl	—	—	—	—	
iTunes Sessions	Release date: July 31, 2012; Label: Aware/Columbia; Format: Digital download	103	2	—	35	
Mat Kearney	Release date: December 8, 2017; Label: Tomorrow Music	—	—	46	—	
City of Black & White Revisited	Release date: June 28, 2019; Label: Tomorrow Music; Format: Vinyl / Digital download	—	40	—	—	
"—" denotes releases that did not chart

=== Live concerts ===
- Mat Kearney: Live at The Fillmore, San Francisco (2010)

=== Singles ===
Year	Title	Peak chart positions					Certifications (sales threshold)	Album
Year	Title	US	US Adult Pop	US Christ.	US Pop	AUS	Certifications (sales threshold)	Album
2006	"Nothing Left to Lose"	41	7	21	36	—	RIAA: Platinum	Nothing Left to Lose
2006	"Undeniable"	— (Note: "Undeniable" did not enter the Hot 100, but peaked at No. 16 on the Bubbling Under Hot 100 chart.)	16	—	30	—		Nothing Left to Lose
2006	"All I Need"	— (Note: "All I Need" did not enter the Hot 100, but peaked at No. 25 on the Bubbling Under Hot 100 chart.)	—	—	—	—		Nothing Left to Lose
2007	"Breathe In, Breathe Out"	—	18	—	—	66		Nothing Left to Lose (2007 Reissue)
2009	"Closer to Love"	91	12	7	—	—	RIAA: Gold	City of Black & White
2009	"All I Have"	—	—	—	—	—		City of Black & White
2010	"Head or Your Heart"	—	—	—	—	—		non-album single
2010	"Edge of the World (A Children's Song)"	—	—	—	—	—		non-album single
2011	"Hey Mama"	— (Note: "Hey Mama" did not enter the Hot 100, but peaked at No. 11 on the Bubbling Under Hot 100 chart.)	18	—	—	—		Young Love
2011	"Down"	—	—	21	—	—		Young Love
2011	"Ships in the Night"	87	22	10	—	—	RIAA: Gold	Young Love
2014	"Heartbeat"	—	31	—	—	—		Just Kids
2015	"Billion"	—	39	—	—	—		Just Kids
2015	"One Heart"	—	16	34	—	—		Just Kids
2015	"Air I Breathe"	—	33	8	—	—		Just Kids
2017	"Better Than I Used To Be" (with AFSheen)	—	—	—	—	—		Crazytalk
2018	"Kings & Queens"	—	21	—	—	—		Crazytalk
2018	"Face to Face"	—	—	23	—	—		Crazytalk
2018	"Memorized"	—	—	—	—	—		Crazytalk
2020	"Grand Canyon"	—	—	—	—	—		January Flower
2020	"Can't Look Back"	—	—	—	—	—		January Flower
2021	"Powerless"	—	—	—	—	—		January Flower
2021	"Pontiac"	—	—	40	—	—		January Flower
2023	"Christmas Miracle"	–	–	–	–	–		Christmas Miracle / White Christmas
2023	"White Christmas"	–	–	–	–	–		Christmas Miracle / White Christmas
2026	"Catch A Fire"	–	–	–	–	–		
2026	"Big Man" (with Steinza)	–	–	–	–	–		
2026	"Gotta Have You"	–	–	–	–	–		
2026	"Fall On Me"	–	–	–	–	–		
2026	"Weakness"	–	–	–	–	–		
"—" denotes releases that did not chart

=== Other appearances ===
List of compilation and guest appearances
Year	Artist	Album	Title	Additional info
2001	DJ Maj	Full Plates: Mixtape .002	"Gung Ho"	Also featuring Knowdaverbs
2002	Stacie Orrico	Say It Again	"Security"	Say It Again was set to be released in 2002. Promo copies were sent out, but upon co-signing with Virgin Records, the album was delayed and reworked. When the album was eventually released in 2003 as Stacie Orrico, Kearney was no longer featured on the song.
2003	ZOEgirl	Different Kind of Free	"Different Kind of Free"	
2011	Various	Mercyland: Hymns for the Rest of Us	"Walking Over the Water"	Harmony vocals by Jennifer Knapp
2013	Brad Paisley	Wheelhouse	"Pressing on a Bruise"	
2014	Ingrid Michaelson	Lights Out	"One Night Town"	
2015	Various	The Magic Strings of Frankie Presto: A Musical Companion	"I Want To Love You"	
2017	Filous	For Love	"Vienna by the Sea"	
2017	Filous	For Love	"Goodbye"	
2020	ROZES	Crazy	"Walls"	
2021	Echosmith	Tell Her You Love Her - single	"Tell Her You Love Her" (featuring Mat Kearney)	New version of Echosmith's song from their 2013 debut album Talking Dreams
2025	Ben Rector	The Richest Man In The World	"Praying For Me"	

== Awards ==
=== GMA Dove Awards ===
Year	Award	Result
2006	New Artist of the Year	Nominated
2006	Rap/Hip-Hop Recorded Song of the Year ("Trainwreck")	Won
2007	Male Vocalist of the Year	Nominated
2007	Song of the Year ("Nothing Left to Lose")	Nominated
2007	Pop/Contemporary Album of the Year (Nothing Left to Lose)	Nominated

== Media appearances ==
Kearney's songs have appeared on the following television series: 30 Rock, Awake, Dirty Sexy Money, Kyle XY, The Unit, Without a Trace, Laguna Beach, The Hills, Bones, Jericho, Friday Night Lights, Wildfire, What About Brian, South Beach, 8th & Ocean, One Tree Hill, Scrubs, The Closer, NCIS, Life Unexpected, Grey's Anatomy, Parenthood, So You Think You Can Dance, The Vampire Diaries and A to Z. His song "Runaway" is featured on the Soul Surfer movie soundtrack. Kearney's song "Sooner or Later" provides the background music to the WWDC 2013 and Google's Zeitgeist 2011: Year in Review video, which was uploaded to YouTube on December 14, 2011. He was also on The Today Show performing the song "Billion". In an interview with Entertainment Weekly, Ricky Gervais included Kearney on his "Must List", stating "This singer-songwriter does spoken word that sounds like French hip-hop." His song "Coming Home" is used by the University of Oregon Ducks football team.
