= White Ink, Black Ink =

Studio album by Wheat
- Released: July 21, 2009
- Genre: Indie rock
- Length: 33:22
- Label: The Rebel Group
- Producer: Wheat and Ray Jeffrey

Wheat chronology
Everyday I Said a Prayer for Kathy and Made a One Inch Square (2007)	White Ink, Black Ink (2009)

Professional ratings
Review scores
Source	Rating
Pitchfork Media	(7.4/10)

White Ink, Black Ink is the fifth full-length album by Wheat. It was released in the summer of 2009. In the song "Changes Is" the little girl who can be heard searching for her blanket is lead singer Scott Levesque's daughter, Tru Leigh Levesque.

== Track listing ==
All songs written by Wheat (Brendan Harney and Scott Levesque).

1. H.O.T.T. – 2:27
2. Changes Is – 3:52
3. My Warning Song (Everything Is Gonna Be Alright) – 3:07
4. El Sincero – 2:56
5. Living 2 Die Vs. Dying 2 Live – 3:07
6. If Everything Falls Together – 2:50
7. Music Is Drugs – 4:41
8. Coke and Tanqueray – 0:31
9. Mountains – 3:41
10. I Want Less – 4:03
11. Baby in My Way – 2:07

== Production notes ==
Recorded at Liberty and Union (Taunton, Mass.); additional recording by Wheat at home. Mixed by Eli Janney at Ishlab and Saltlands (Brooklyn, N.Y.). Mastered by Joe Lambert at Joe Lambert Mastering (Brooklyn). Additional playing by Luke Hebert and Ray Jeffrey; strings by Chris Baum.
