= Everyday I Said a Prayer for Kathy and Made a One Inch Square =

Studio album by Wheat
- Released: May 22, 2007
- Genre: Indie rock
- Length: 42:59
- Label: Empyrean Records
- Producer: Wheat and Rick Lescault

Wheat chronology
Per Second, Per Second, Per Second ... Every Second (2003)	Everyday I Said a Prayer for Kathy and Made a One Inch Square (2007)	White Ink, Black Ink (2009)

Professional ratings
Aggregate scores
Source	Rating
Metacritic	59/100
Review scores
Source	Rating
Allmusic	3.5/5 stars
Pitchfork Media	(7.4/10)

Everyday I Said a Prayer for Kathy and Made a One Inch Square is the fourth full-length album by Wheat. It was released in the spring of 2007.

== Track listing ==
All songs written by Wheat (Brendan Harney and Scott Levesque).

1. Closeness – 5:08
2. Little White Dove – 3:37
3. Move = Move – 4:21
4. I Had Angels Watching Over Me – 3:05
5. Init .005 (Formerly, a Case of ...) – 4:27
6. Saint in Law – 2:41
7. What You Got – 3:22
8. To, as in Addressing the Grave – 3:16
9. Round in the Corners – 3:47
10. An Exhausted Fixer – 4:39
11. Courting Ed Templeton – 4:36

== Production notes ==
Recorded at Electric Ali (Fairhaven, Mass.); additional recording by Wheat at home. Mixed by Rick Lescault. Mastered by Jeff Lipton at Peerless Mastering (Boston, Mass.); assistant mastering engineer: Jessica Thompson.
