= Nothing Left to Lose (Mat Kearney album) =

Studio album by Mat Kearney
- Released: April 18, 2006
- Recorded: 2004–06
- Genres: Rock, hip hop, acoustic
- Length: 60:58
- Labels: Aware, Columbia
- Producers: Robert Marvin, Mat Kearney

Mat Kearney chronology
Bullet (2004)	Nothing Left to Lose (2006)	City of Black & White (2009)

Singles from Nothing Left to Lose
- 1. "Nothing Left to Lose" Released: May 2006; 2. "Undeniable" Released: 2006; 3. "All I Need" Released: 2006; 4. "Breathe In, Breathe Out" Released: 2007

Professional ratings
Review scores
Source	Rating
AllMusic	3/5 stars
Jesus Freak Hideout	4.5/5 stars
Rolling Stone	2/5 stars

Nothing Left to Lose is the second studio album and major-label debut by Mat Kearney. Several tracks are re-recordings or remixes of songs originally featured on Kearney's first album, Bullet.

"All I Need", "Crashing Down", and "Where We Gonna Go From Here" were all featured in season 3 episodes of the hit TV series Grey's Anatomy. "Breathe In, Breathe Out" is also being used as the current Grey's Anatomy song with a music video featuring Mat and clips from seasons 3 and 4 of the show. The track "Nothing Left to Lose" was used in a commercial promoting the 2007 film, Catch and Release, and was also used on an episode of the TV series Jericho and Dirty Sexy Money. The tracks "All I Need" and "Where We Gonna Go from Here" feature in the fourth and tenth episodes (respectively) of the first season of the TV series Kyle XY. "All I Need" was also featured in a season 5 episode of NCIS. At a concert in Houston in 2006, Kearney revealed that his song "All I Need" was written based on two of his friends from New Orleans and their story during Hurricane Katrina. Additionally, Kearney's song "Renaissance" was written about friends from Oregon who survived a severe car crash. His song, "Where We Gonna Go From Here?", was featured during the third season of Grey's Anatomy and on the first season finale of ABC Family's show Kyle XY. Most recently, the song was also featured in the Season 7 opener of NBC's Scrubs and in an episode of Royal Pains. Kearney's single, "Breathe In, Breathe Out", debuted in September 2007, and marks the singer's fourth and highest profile placement in Grey's Anatomy. The song is currently used as the theme in television promotions for the series' fourth season, including a music video that premiered on September 19 during the fourth season preview. The song was also featured in the season 4 finale of 30 Rock.

== Track listing ==
All songs written by Mat Kearney except where indicated.

1. "Undeniable"* (Kearney/Robert "Aurel M" Marvin) – 4:26
2. "Nothing Left to Lose" – 4:23
3. "Crashing Down" – 4:13
4. "Girl America"† – 4:02 (Kearney/Marvin)
5. "In the Middle"† – 4:15
6. "Can't Break Her Fall" – 3:49
7. "What's a Boy to Do" – 4:02
8. "Wait" – 4:38 (Kearney/Marvin)
9. "Bullet"† – 4:23 (Kearney/Marvin)
10. "All I Need" – 4:27
11. "Renaissance"* – 4:49
12. "Where We Gonna Go from Here" – 4:05
13. "Won't Back Down"* – 5:10
14. "Breathe In Breathe Out" – 3:44 (2007 re-issue bonus track)
15. "Chicago" (Acoustic Version) – 4:17 (iTunes bonus track)

* originally featured on Bullet and unchanged on this record
† originally featured on Bullet and remixed for inclusion on this record

== Personnel ==
- Mat Kearney – vocals, acoustic piano, acoustic guitar
- Robert Marvin – acoustic piano (1–5, 8, 9, 12), toy piano (1–5, 8, 9, 12), programming (1–5, 8, 9, 12), bass (1–5, 8, 9, 12), vibraphone (1–5, 8, 9, 12)
- Paul Moak – acoustic piano (2–4, 6–8, 10, 12), Rhodes piano (2–4, 6–8, 10, 12), Wurlitzer electric piano (2–4, 6–8, 10, 12), Hammond B3 organ (2–4, 6–8, 10, 12), accordion (2–4, 6–8, 10, 12), electric guitar (2–4, 6–8, 10, 12), banjo (2–4, 6–8, 10, 12)
- Christopher Stevens – Hammond B3 organ (5)
- David May – electric guitar (1, 11)
- Lynn Nichols – acoustic guitar (1, 9, 11), electric guitar (1, 9, 11)
- Greg Hagan – acoustic guitar (4, 9), electric guitar (4, 9)
- Jerry McPherson – acoustic guitar (4), electric guitar (4)
- Judson Spence – bass (1, 9, 11)
- Tony Lucido – bass (2, 3, 4, 6, 7, 8, 10, 12)
- Lindsay Jamieson – drums (1, 2, 5, 8, 9, 11)
- Will Sayles – drums (3, 6, 10), percussion (3, 6, 10)
- Jeremy Lutito – drums (4), percussion (4)
- Claire Indie – cello (5)
- Andy Selby – strings and string arrangements (10)
- Matt Butler – cello (13)

== Production ==
- Mat Kearney – producer
- Robert Marvin – producer, recording, engineer
- Steve Smith – A&R
- Andy Selby – additional engineer, recording (13)
- Paul Moak – recording (2–4, 6–8, 10, 12)
- Daniel Allen – recording (10)
- Steve Winiarski – recording (13)
- Joe Baldridge – bass and drum recording (1, 2, 4, 5, 8, 9, 11–13)
- Nathan Watkins – bass and drum recording assistant (1, 2, 4, 5, 8, 9, 11–13)
- F. Reid Shippen – mixing (1)
- Michael H. Brauer – mixing (2–10, 12)
- Tom Laune – mixing (11, 13)
- Lee Bridges – mix assistant (1)
- Keith Gary – mix assistant (2–10, 12), Pro Tools engineer
- Will Hensley – mix assistant (2–10, 12), Pro Tools engineer
- Steve Lotz – mix assistant (11, 13)
- Greg Calbi – mastering
- Dan Mandell – art direction, design
- Jeremy Cowart – photography

Studios

- Recorded at Dark Horse Recording Studio (Franklin, TN); The Smoakstack and Sweetbriar Studio (Nashville, TN); Dutchland Studios (Los Angeles, CA).
- Mixed at Quad Recording Studios (New York City, NY); Sound Stage Studios and Bridgeway Studios (Nashville, TN).
- Mastered at Sterling Sound (New York City, NY).

== Awards ==
In 2007, the album was nominated for a Dove Award for Pop/Contemporary Album of the Year at the 38th GMA Dove Awards.

== Charts ==
Chart performance for Nothing Left to Lose
Chart (2006)	Peak position
US Billboard 200	109
US Top Christian Albums (Billboard)	4
US Heatseekers Albums (Billboard)	2

== Certifications ==
Region	Certification	Certified units/sales
United States (RIAA)	Gold	500,000^{‡}
^{‡} Sales+streaming figures based on certification alone.
