= Tabitha's Secret =

American rock band

- Origin: Orlando, Florida, U.S.
- Genres: Alternative rock, jam rock
- Years active: 1990–1995
- Label: JTJ Records
- Spinoffs: Matchbox Twenty
- Past members: Rob Thomas; Brian Yale; Paul Doucette; John Leslie Goff; Jay Stanley

Tabitha's Secret was an American rock band formed in March 1990 in Orlando, Florida. It was originally composed of lead vocalist Rob Thomas, John Leslie Goff and Jay Stanley on guitar, Brian Yale on bass (Colin Chrisman was the original bass player), and Chris Smith playing drums. In September 1990, Paul Doucette joined the band as a second percussionist, only to replace Chris Smith entirely a year later. Some of the band's most popular songs were "And Around", "Dear Joan", "Unkind", "Forever December", "Paint Me Blue", and "3AM". The group is best known as a precursor to Matchbox Twenty, which was formed by Thomas, Yale, and Doucette after the breakup of Tabitha's Secret.

== Lawsuit ==
In 1997, Stanley and Goff brought claims of fiduciary breach of contract against their former bandmates and tortious interference against Serletic and his attorney. The case was settled out of court, with Stanley and Goff receiving the rights to the disputed recordings and permission to continue using the Tabitha's Secret band name. Goff subsequently signed over his remaining interest in the Tabitha's Secret business to Stanley. This lawsuit lasted three years and was settled out of court in 2000.

== Discography ==
- Don't Play with Matches (1997)
- Live (1999)
- Tabitha's Secret? (2001)
- The Vault Vol. 1 (2007)
- The Vault Vol. 2 (2007)
- The Vault Vol. 3: The Covers (2007)
