= Bullet (Mat Kearney album) =

Studio album by Mat Kearney
- Released: October 19, 2004
- Genre: Rock, pop, CCM
- Length: 47:11
- Label: InPop
- Producer: Robert Marvin, Mat Kearney

Mat Kearney chronology
Bullet (2004)	Nothing Left to Lose (2006)

Professional ratings
Review scores
Source	Rating
Jesus Freak Hideout	4/5 stars

Bullet is the independent debut full-length album by Mat Kearney.

== Writing Process ==
Recording took place at Bridge Street Studios and Dark Horse Recording in Nashville by Kearney's producer and friend Robert Marvin. Bullet contains new compositions of four songs from Kearney's 2003 hip-hop EP West In November; "Bullet", "Girl America", "Poor Boy", and "Tomorrow" were significantly restructured and reworked for this release. "Bullet" and "Girl America" received further subtle remixing for inclusion on Kearney's 2006 major label debut, Nothing Left to Lose, along with then-new song "In the Middle". Songs "Undeniable", "Renaissance", and "Won't Back Down" appear on the subsequent 2006 album without any modifications from their initial release on Bullet in 2004.

== Release ==
The album was released on compact disc via Inpop Records, and digitally by EMI Publishing Group. Two covers with the same photograph of Kearney exist, each with different fonts, colors, and title placement.

== Track listing ==
No.	Title	Writer(s)	Length
1.	"Trainwreck"	Mat Kearney, Robert Marvin	3:24
2.	"Undeniable"	Kearney, Marvin	4:24
3.	"Bullet"	Kearney, Marvin	4:28
4.	"Girl America"	Kearney, Marvin	4:04
5.	"In the Middle"	Kearney	4:15
6.	"Renaissance"	Kearney	4:47
7.	"Call Me"	Kearney	3:32
8.	"Poor Boy"	Kearney, Marvin	4:01
9.	"Walking Away"	Kearney, Marvin	5:09
10.	"Tomorrow"	Kearney, Marvin	4:02
11.	"Won't Back Down"	Kearney	5:09
Total length:			47:11

== Personnel ==
- Mat Kearney - lead vocals; acoustic guitar on tracks 1–3, 6–7; piano on "Won't Back Down"; harmonica on "Call Me"
- Lindsay Jamieson - drums on tracks 1–6, 8–10
- Tony Lucido - bass on tracks 1, 4, 8, 9
- Judson Spence - bass on tracks 1–6, 8–10
- Lynn Nichols - electric guitar on tracks 1–3, 6, 9; acoustic guitar on "Undeniable"
- Jerry McPherson - electric guitar on tracks, 4, 8, 9
- David May - acoustic guitar on tracks 8, 10; electric guitar on tracks 2, 6
- Greg Hagan - acoustic guitar on "Girl America"; electric guitar on "Bullet"
- Stu G - acoustic guitar on tracks 8, 10
- Chris Stevens - Hammond B-3 organ on "In the Middle"
- Josiah Bell - drum programming on "Trainwreck"
- Claire Indie - cello on "In the Middle"
- Matt Butler - cello on "Call Me"
- Christa Black - violin on "Tomorrow"
- Chrissy Conway - background vocals on "Tomorrow"
- David Reed - piano on "Walking Away"
- Robert Marvin - piano on "In the Middle", all additional instrumentation

[Credits adapted from lyric booklet]
