= Aware Records =

American record label

- Founded: 1993
- Founder: Gregg Latterman
- Distributor: Republic Records
- Genre: Pop, rock, folk, alternative
- Country of origin: U.S.
- Location: Evanston, Illinois
- Official website: awarerecords.com

Aware Records is an American record label based in Evanston, Illinois, a suburb of Chicago. Some of the label's acts have included John Mayer, Train, Five for Fighting, Mat Kearney, and Guster.

== History ==
Aware Records was founded in 1993 by Gregg Latterman with the simple intention to find unsigned acts and increase their national exposure through a compilation album. In the fall of 1995, the label formed the inaugural Aware Tour. The first tour led to national tours from 1996 to 1999. In July 1997, Aware entered into an agreement with Columbia Records providing the major label with grassroots artist development, and Aware access to national marketing and distribution. The 2003 Aware Tour featured Toad the Wet Sprocket as headliner, with Aware bands Wheat and Bleu as supporting acts. Aware's joint venture with Columbia Records was renewed in the summer of 2002.

Through Aware's relationship with Columbia Records, they have released full-length albums by artists such as Train, Five for Fighting and John Mayer. Aware was the exclusive CD retailer for the H.O.R.D.E. tours from 1995–1998 and Woodstock '99. In July 2010 Aware's joint venture deal with Columbia expired; Aware has since signed a new deal with Universal Republic.

In 2000 Aware Records started an Internet radio station through CJ Hebb (AOL Radio) and his company New England Digital Arts. The agreement was that the radio broadcasts would focus on record label artists and royalties would be paid to ASCAP, BMI and SESAC.

== A-Squared Management ==
Formed in October 1999, A-Squared Management (or A² Management) is a separate management division whose current clients include Ben Rector.

Former management clients include The Fray, Liz Phair, Brandi Carlile, Michelle Branch, Motion City Soundtrack, Jack's Mannequin, This Providence, Brendan Benson, A Rocket to the Moon, Glen Phillips (of Toad and the Wet Sprocket), and Five For Fighting.

== Artists ==
Note: These artists have a current or previous affiliation with Aware Records; however, they may not have released any albums through the label.

- Acoustic Junction
- Dave Barnes
- Better than Ezra
- Bleu
- Brandi Carlile
- Nelson Chin
- Dovetail Joint
- Farmer
- Newton Faulkner
- Five for Fighting
- Guster
- Hootie and the Blowfish
- Once Hush
- Jackopierce
- Jupiter Coyote
- Mat Kearney
- Wakeland
- Edwin McCain
- John Mayer
- Mile
- Mutemath
- Matt Nathanson
- Nineteen Wheels
- Alice Peacock
- Cary Pierce
- Glen Phillips (of Toad the Wet Sprocket)
- Melissa Polinar
- Red Elephant
- Kyle Riabko
- Riddlin' Kids
- Slackjaw
- Stepanian
- Stir
- Tabitha's Secret
- Angel Taylor
- Thanks to Gravity
- The Thorns
- Train
- Vertical Horizon
- The Verve Pipe
- Matt Wertz
- Wheat
- Zach Heckendorf
