= Music of Michigan =

The music of Michigan is composed of many different genres. The city of Detroit has been one of the most musically influential and innovative cities for the past 50 years, whether in Michigan or anywhere else in the United States. Impressively, for 48 straight years (1959–2007) a greater Michigan-area artist has produced a chart-topping recording. Michigan is perhaps best known for three developments: early punk rock (or proto-punk), Motown, and techno.

Michigan musicians with a #1 Billboard Hot 100 hit include artists from the 1950s: Guy Mitchell (Rockabilly genre) and Bill Haley (of Bill Haley & His Comets); from the 1960s: Del Shannon, The Supremes, The Marvelettes, The Temptations, The Four Tops, Stevie Wonder, Marvin Gaye, "The Prince of Soul"; Smokey Robinson and the Miracles, Aretha Franklin, "The Queen of Soul" (d. 2018); Mary Wells, Tommy James and the Shondells, and ? and the Mysterians; from the 1970s: Al Green, The Spinners, Grand Funk Railroad, and The Knack; from the 1980s: Madonna, "The Queen of Pop", Bob Seger, and Ray Parker Jr.; from the 1990s: Aaliyah, "The Queen of Urban Pop"; from the 2000s: Eminem (who has had 10 consecutive #1 albums from The Marshall Mathers LP in 2000 to Music to Be Murdered By in 2020). Eminem was the best-selling artist of the 2000s.

Other Detroit musicians with a #1 album on the Billboard 200 include Kid Rock with Rock n Roll Jesus in 2007; Jack White of The White Stripes, with 3 albums (Blunderbuss in 2012, Lazaretto, and Boarding House Reach; Jack White's group The Raconteurs also had a #1 album); Big Sean, with 3 consecutive #1 albums, including Dark Sky Paradise in 2015; and NF, from northern Michigan, with 2 #1 albums, including one in 2018. Eminem's groups D12 and Bad Meets Evil have also had #1 albums. Dej Loaf is the latest hip-hop singer to make national waves. Mike Posner is another notable example. His debut album, 31 Minutes to Takeoff (2010), includes the US Billboard Hot 100 top 10 single "Cooler than Me" as well as the top 20 single "Please Don't Go". In 2016 he released his second album, At Night, Alone. A remix of his 2015 single "I Took a Pill in Ibiza" from the album peaked in the top 10 on the charts in 27 countries around the world, including hitting number one in many and the top five on the Billboard Hot 100 in the United States. He has written songs for a great number of fellow artists, and is a member of the alternative hip-hop duo Mansionz. Alice Cooper, "The Godfather of Shock Rock," had a #1 Billboard 200 album with the hard rock Billion Dollar Babies in 1973. Additionally, the new-age classic rock band Greta Van Fleet, from Frankenmuth, have been nominated for four Grammy Awards in 2019 and won the Best New Artist award from the 2017 Loudwire Music Awards.

== Classical ==
Classical music and the arts in Michigan have long been supported by the auto industry and the auto magnates who became rich from it. The Detroit Symphony Orchestra, founded in 1914, is the premier orchestra in the state and performs at Orchestra Hall in Detroit. The Symphony runs the Detroit Youth Symphony, the Elaine Lebenbom Competition for female composers and shares its campus with Detroit's performing arts high school. The Sphinx Music Competition for young black and Latino classical musicians is based in the Detroit-Ann Arbor area. Interlochen Center for the Arts is an arts and music boarding school in Northern Michigan and also provides summer camps as does the Blue Lake Fine Arts Camp. In 2006, Leonard Slatkin and the University of Michigan School of Music Symphony won a Grammy for Songs Of Innocence And Of Experience. Paul Smith, who was born in Calumet, was a composer named a Disney Legend and worked on many Disney films and animations, including Snow White, Pinocchio, and Bambi. Notable contemporary Michigan classical composers include James Hartway and Augustus O. Hill.

The Detroit Opera House is the site of 4 or 5 fully staged operas yearly as well as a dance series. The opera Margaret Garner (by Richard Danielpour and Toni Morrison) was sponsored by and debuted at Detroit. Another work debuted by the Michigan Opera Theatre was Cyrano by the company's director David DiChiera.

== Folk ==
Folklorist Ivan Walton, who taught at the University of Michigan, collected the songs of Great Lakes sailors.

Duane Starcher recorded Woods and Water: Folk songs from Michigan History, released in 1965 on Western Michigan University Aural Press.

The Ark is a folk music venue in Ann Arbor in existence since 1965.

== Blues ==
Detroit has had a thriving blues scene (see Detroit blues) for some time, including most famously John Lee Hooker.

== Jazz ==
Jazz artists born in Detroit include pianists Tommy Flanagan, Hugh Lawson, Barry Harris, Roland Hanna, Kenny Cox, pianist and composer Alice Coltrane, pianist and vibraphonist Terry Pollard, drummers Louis Hayes, Eddie Locke, Oliver Jackson, Roy Brooks, Frank Gant, Gerald Cleaver, Pheeroan akLaff, vibraphonist Milt Jackson, guitarist Kenny Burrell, trombonist Curtis Fuller, French horn player Julius Watkins, saxophonists J. R. Monterose, Faruq Z. Bey, James Carter, Kenny Garrett, baritone saxophonist Pepper Adams, double bassist Doug Watkins, trumpeter Donald Byrd, harpist Dorothy Ashby, violinist Regina Carter, and singers Sheila Jordan, Della Reese, Barbara Dane, and Dianne Reeves. Drummer Elvin Jones, trumpeter Thad Jones, and pianist Geri Allen were born in Pontiac. Singer Betty Carter was born in Flint. Double-bassist Ron Carter was born in Ferndale. Singer Barbara Morrison was born in Ypsilanti.

The Detroit International Jazz Festival was founded in 1980 and features free outdoor concerts in venues in the city.

== R&B/Soul ==
Fortune Records was a pre-Motown, Detroit-based, independent record label that specialized in soul, doo-wop, rockabilly, gospel, blues and rock and roll. It was owned by Jack and Devora Brown, a husband and wife business team who would operate the label with help from their son, Sheldon Brown. The label's biggest stars included John Lee Hooker, Nolan Strong, Andre Williams and Nathaniel Mayer. The label would release more than 800 vinyl records before stopping original releases in the 1970s. While Fortune never made it to Motown's height of fame, artists like the late Nolan Strong proved to be influential. In his autobiography, Smokey Robinson named Strong as one of his biggest and earliest influences. Andre Williams and Nathaniel Mayer both had career resurgences in the 2000s garage rock scene. Bands like Reigning Sound, Goober & the Peas, and The Black Keys have all cited Fortune artists as influential.

Detroit's Motown Records dominated soul music for many years. Musicians included Stevie Wonder, The Temptations, Aretha Franklin (buried in Woodlawn Cemetery in Detroit, where The Four Tops are also buried; besides "Respect", she had another #1 Hot 100 hit with "I Knew You Were Waiting (For Me)" in 1987), Diana Ross, Marvin Gaye, Martha & the Vandellas, Smokey Robinson, Mary Wells (#1 with "My Guy"), The Supremes and The Jackson 5. All of these artists had a #1 Billboard Hot 100 hit, except Martha & the Vandellas. The Supremes had 12 #1 Billboard Hot 100 hits. The Temptations had 4 #1 Hot 100 hits. Stevie Wonder had 10 #1 Hot 100 hits. Led by Berry Gordy, Motown revolutionized soul and made Detroit one of the American centers of musical innovation. Although many who have never lived in the region incorrectly associate certain music from Michigan as being Detroit-oriented, Motown's productions were, in reality, among the limited number of recorded works actually linked to the city itself. Many Motown recordings originated in the city, and many Motown artists were from the city of Detroit, or migrated to the immediate area.

Ready for the World formed in Flint in 1982. They had a Billboard Hot 100 #1 song with "Oh Sheila" in 1985.

== Country ==
Country music, especially in the Metro Detroit area, is massively popular in Michigan. Some of the state's most well-known country artists include Kid Rock, Uncle Kracker, and Josh Gracin.

== Pop ==
1960s pop-rock singer Del Shannon came from Coopersville, near Grand Rapids. He had the #1 Billboard Hot 100 hit "Runaway" in 1961.

Singer Madonna, born Madonna Ciccone in Bay City, later living in the Rochester area (and attending the University of Michigan), rose to be considered the "Queen of Pop" by many. Her long career began in the early 1980s and she continues to top charts today. Madonna had 12 #1 hits on the Billboard Hot 100, including "Like a Virgin", from 1984.

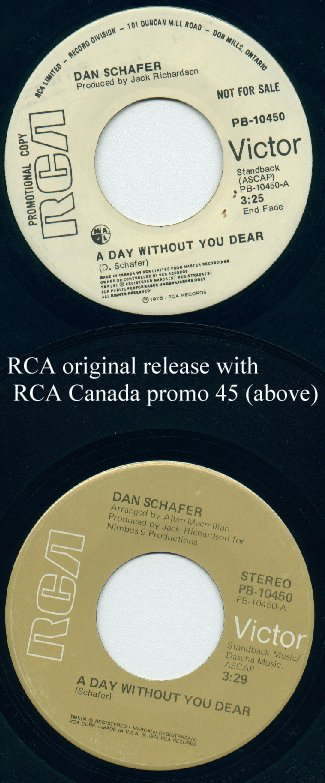
1st Dan Schafer RCA single US & Canada promo

Mike Posner, from Oakland County, had the popular song "I Took a Pill in Ibiza" in 2016.

== Rock ==
Hank Ballard was an early rock and roll artist born in Detroit, who had success with the 1954 song "Work with Me, Annie". In 1955, Detroit-native Bill Haley ushered in the rock and roll era with the release of "Rock Around The Clock". Detroit was a center of the 1960s rock scene, with such legendary bands as The Amboy Dukes (featuring guitarist Ted Nugent), The Bob Seger System, ? and the Mysterians, the MC5, Mitch Ryder and the Detroit Wheels ("Devil With a Blue Dress On"), and Tommy James and the Shondells ("Crimson and Clover"). In the 1970s, Bob Seger, Ted Nugent, Alice Cooper, and Grand Funk Railroad (from Flint, who had a #1 Hot 100 hit with "We're an American Band" in 1973) were popular rock stars. The Hideout and other teen clubs in the Detroit suburbs during the mid-1960s were a hotbed for such influential groups as the Fugitives, The Pleasure Seekers/Cradle, the Subterraneans (featuring Detroit native Glenn Frey), and the Underdogs. The Rationals and The Prime Movers formed in Ann Arbor, Unrelated Segments formed in Taylor, Luv'd Ones formed in Niles, and The JuJus formed in Grand Rapids.

In the late 1960s and early 1970s, punk rock pioneers like the MC5 and The Stooges (from Ann Arbor, with lead singer Iggy Pop, born in Muskegon) came from southeastern Michigan. Iggy Pop attended the University of Michigan. These performers had incendiary lyrics and outrageous, highly physical live shows. The Grande Ballroom in Detroit was an important venue for these groups. Saginaw/Bay City's ? and the Mysterians, who had a Billboard #1 hit in 1966 with "96 Tears", are widely credited as influencing many later garage punk bands; the Mysterians' sound melded Tex-Mex influences and James Brown-style soul. The Dogs formed in 1969, influenced by the MC5 and The Stooges, and were active in the Detroit, New York, and LA proto-punk scenes. Death, from Detroit, was active from 1971 to 1976, with a self-released limited single in 1976 being their only release until 2009, when Drag City began releasing the band's unreleased 1970s demo recordings and surviving members reformed the group.

Rodriguez, from Detroit, began his career in the early 1970s and gained a following in South Africa and Australia. Searching for Sugar Man is a film that documented his life and career.

In the late 1970s, Detroit had a small new wave scene that included The Romantics ("What I Like About You") and Sonic's Rendezvous Band, who played at a converted supper club called Bookie's. The new wave rock scene of the late 1970s also included vinyl record releases by the film-influenced Cinecyde, whose label Tremor Records released singles, EPs, and LPs by the group and many other local, like-minded artists. The Ann Arbor-based group Destroy All Monsters began as an art-oriented experimental group but soon evolved into a hard rock band with a psychedelic edge, prominently due to the presence of Ron Asheton (The Stooges) and Michael Davis (MC5). Vocalist Niagara, a founding group member, would also gain notoriety for her film noir-influenced graphic pop art in later years.

In the 1980s, rock bands that had minor to major attention and/or critical acclaim include The Romantics, Glenn Frey, Discipline, His Name Is Alive, Adrenalin, Seduce, Madam X, and Halloween.

The 1980s also saw Marshall Crenshaw from the Detroit suburb of Berkley, attain fame with his releases on Warner Bros. and an appearance as Buddy Holly in the film La Bamba. His 1981 recording, "Someday, Someway", made the Top 40 in both Billboard and Cash Box in 1982. The Gories are a garage punk band formed in 1986 in Detroit. The trio consists of Mick Collins (of The Dirtbombs), Dan Kroha (of The Demolition Doll Rods), and Peggy O'Neill. The group originally broke up in 1992, but have reunited since 2009.

In the 1990s, East Lansing band The Verve Pipe rose to brief stardom with the hit "The Freshman", and Sponge, from Detroit, had moderate national success with a dual-guitar sound reminiscent of the MC5. Romeo native Kid Rock gained national prominence in 1999 with his album Devil Without a Cause which melded his background as a rapper with other influences from Detroit-based musicians and genres (e.g., Bob Seger, Ted Nugent, and Motown). Uncle Kracker and alternative metal band Taproot also had success in the early 2000s.

The first decade of the 21st century also saw a further revival of the Detroit garage rock sound, typified by bands such as The White Stripes, The Von Bondies, Gore Gore Girls, The Go, and The Detroit Cobras.

Notable post-hardcore bands include Chiodos, from Davison; I See Stars, from Warren; For the Fallen Dreams, from Lansing; La Dispute, from Grand Rapids; Gone By Sunset, from Sterling Heights; Famous Last Words, from Petoskey; Flint metalcore bands It Lies Within and King 810; We Came as Romans, from Troy; and I Prevail, from Southfield.

Notable alternative/indie rock bands include Frankenmuth's Greta Van Fleet had a No. 3 album on the Billboard 200 in 2018, The People's Temple from Lansing, Whirlwind Heat from Grand Rapids, The Hounds Below from Ferndale, The Sixth Generation from Niles, Pop Evil from North Muskegon, and Protomartyr from Detroit. Alternative metal band Shade Zero was formed in Metro Detroit.

=== Indie ===
Jad Fair was born in Coldwater. His Name is Alive and Thunderbirds Are Now! are from Livonia. Windy & Carl are from Dearborn. Wolf Eyes formed in Ann Arbor. Magdelene Rose was born in Flint. Multi-instrumentalist and singer-songwriter Sufjan Stevens was born in Detroit and moved to Petoskey (far northern Lower Peninsula) at age 9. Stevens' music has allusions and influences from all over the state. He released a state-themed baroque pop album, Michigan, in 2003. Sufjan Stevens attended Hope College in Holland. Tally Hall was formed in Ann Arbor with 4 of the 5 members growing up there.

=== Hardcore ===
The hardcore punk scene had arrived by 1981, and included Detroit bands Negative Approach and Degenerates, as well as Necros, Violent Apathy, Spite (Kalamzaoo), Meatmen, and Crucifucks (Lansing). Tesco Vee, of the Meatmen, launched the first Midwest hardcore record label, Touch & Go. Tesco also helped form an alliance between the Detroit scene and Minor Threat and other Washington, D.C. bands.

== Electronic Music ==
Techno was primarily developed in basement studios by "The Belleville Three", a cadre of African-American men, Derrick May, Kevin Saunderson, and Juan Atkins, who were attending college at the time near Detroit. Influenced heavily by George Clinton's Parliament-Funkadelic, Germany's Kraftwerk, and the house music coming out of Chicago at the time, they created a new genre of percussive, entirely synthetic electronic dance music.

In the 1990s, a fusion of Miami bass, techno, and hip-hop called ghettotech arose in Detroit. Some notable artists were DJ Assault and DJ Godfather. Since May 2000, Detroit has also been the home of the hugely popular Detroit Electronic Music Festival and related festivals.

The west coast of Michigan hosts the eight-day Electric Forest Festival each summer since 2008, which features famous EDM DJs and jam bands.

== Hip hop ==
In the mid-late 1980s, Awesome Dre and the Hard Core Committee, along with Prince Vince and the Hip Hop Force, were among the first wave of Detroit artists, with Awesome Dre becoming the first to go national with videos receiving regular spins on Yo! MTV Raps. Also in the mid-late 1980s came others like D the Great, Detroit's Most Wanted, Suavey Spy, Mike Fresh, Ace Lee, Eveready Crew, Esham, J to The D, and Silveree. Some of these acts continued into the 1990s, which saw the emergence of others local hip-hop artists such as AWOL, Smiley, Kaos & Mystro, The DBGz, Goon Squad, Playskule, Bombshell, and Boss; MF 911 followed. Undoubtedly, Michigan's most famous hip hop star is Eminem. Eminem has had 4 #1 Billboard Hot 100 hits, including "Lose Yourself" from the film 8 Mile in 2002. Also from Detroit is his group D12; an artist once under his label, Obie Trice; and another former associate, Royce Da 5'9". Other performers include Phat Kat, Danny Brown, Insane Clown Posse, One Be Lo, Guilty Simpson, MaGestik LeGend, The Definition, the late J Dilla and his former group Slum Village, and producer and artist Black Milk. Aaliyah (d. 2001), from Detroit, had a #1 Hot 100 hit with "Try Again" in 2000. She had a #1 album in 2001 after her death with Aaliyah (album). Aaliyah had 4 #1 songs on the Hot R&B/Hip-Hop Songs chart including Are You That Somebody? in 1998. Neighboring Flint made significant contributions to hip hop throughout the 1990s, with artists like MC Breed, Top Authority, and The Dayton Family. Since 2011, Big Sean and Dej Loaf are spearheading a national hip-hop sound for Detroit, with up-and-comers like Che (Formally Detroit Che), whose 2014 BET Hip-Hop Awards Cypher with Lil Mama garnered her national recognition.

== See also ==
- Hitsville U.S.A. Motown museum in Detroit
- Music of Detroit
- List of songs about Detroit
- The 100 greatest Detroit songs ever!
- The Detroit Dish:: motorcityrocks.com
- MichiganMusicHub.com : Sharing The Music of Michigan with The World!
