= Reason (Violent Apathy album) =

Compilation album by Violent Apathy
- Released: 1996
- Recorded: 1981
- Genre: Hardcore punk
- Label: Lost and Found

Professional ratings
Review scores
Source	Rating
Allmusic	link

Reason is a 1996 compilation of songs by the hardcore punk band Violent Apathy. The songs are from the early days of the band before the release of their album Here Today.

== Track list ==
1. "Reason"
2. "Immortality"
3. "Hunger Strike"
4. "Real World"
5. "On Trial"
6. "Vice Grip"
7. "Ignorance Is Bliss"
8. "Violent Apathy"
9. "Hypocrite"
10. "Live In"
11. "Warning"
12. "Society Rules"
13. "Desperation Takes Hold"
14. "I Can't Take It"

== Personnel ==
- Andy Bennett II –
- Richard Bowser – guitar
- Jim Forgey – bass guitar
- Tom Fuller – guitar
- Kenny Knott – vocals
- Eliot Rachman (II) – drums
- Todd Viser – bass guitar
