= Spite (band) =

American hardcore punk band

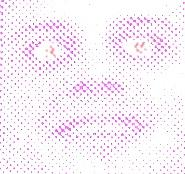
- Image of lead Vocalist

Background information
- Origin: Kalamazoo, Michigan, U.S.
- Genres: Hardcore punk
- Label: CD Baby
- Past members: Scott Boman; Dan Humiston; Tommy Fuller; Greg Fox; Bill "Willie" Axe
- Website: degeneratespite.com

Spite was an American hardcore punk band formed in Kalamazoo, Michigan, U.S. and was a part of the Michigan hardcore scene. It was made up of members from other regional bands who participated in the hardcore music communities inside and outside the region. Vocalist Scott Boman became an area libertarian politician and media personality.

== Band history ==
Spite formed in Kalamazoo, Michigan in the Fall of 1983. These original members of the midwestern hardcore scene, played with other Kalamazoo groups such as Violent Apathy and FAQ. During their brief career they performed with some national acts such as Fang and Born Without a Face. Perhaps their most notable show was with Naked Raygun, and Eleventh Hour at Western Michigan University on February 23, 1985.

Three of Spite's members went on to perform in other groups, while another made his mark in politics. They were: Scott Boman (vocals) former member of the Degenerates, Dan Humiston (bass) former member of Passive Aggression and later member Memories of Tomorrow, Greg Fox (guitar & vocals) who is a former member of Passive Aggression, Bill (Willie) Axe (drums & vocals) who is a former member of Passive Aggression and later member of RollingHead and Memories of Tomorrow, and Tommy Fuller (guitar leads) who was a former member of the Touch and Go Records artist, Violent Apathy

== After Spite ==
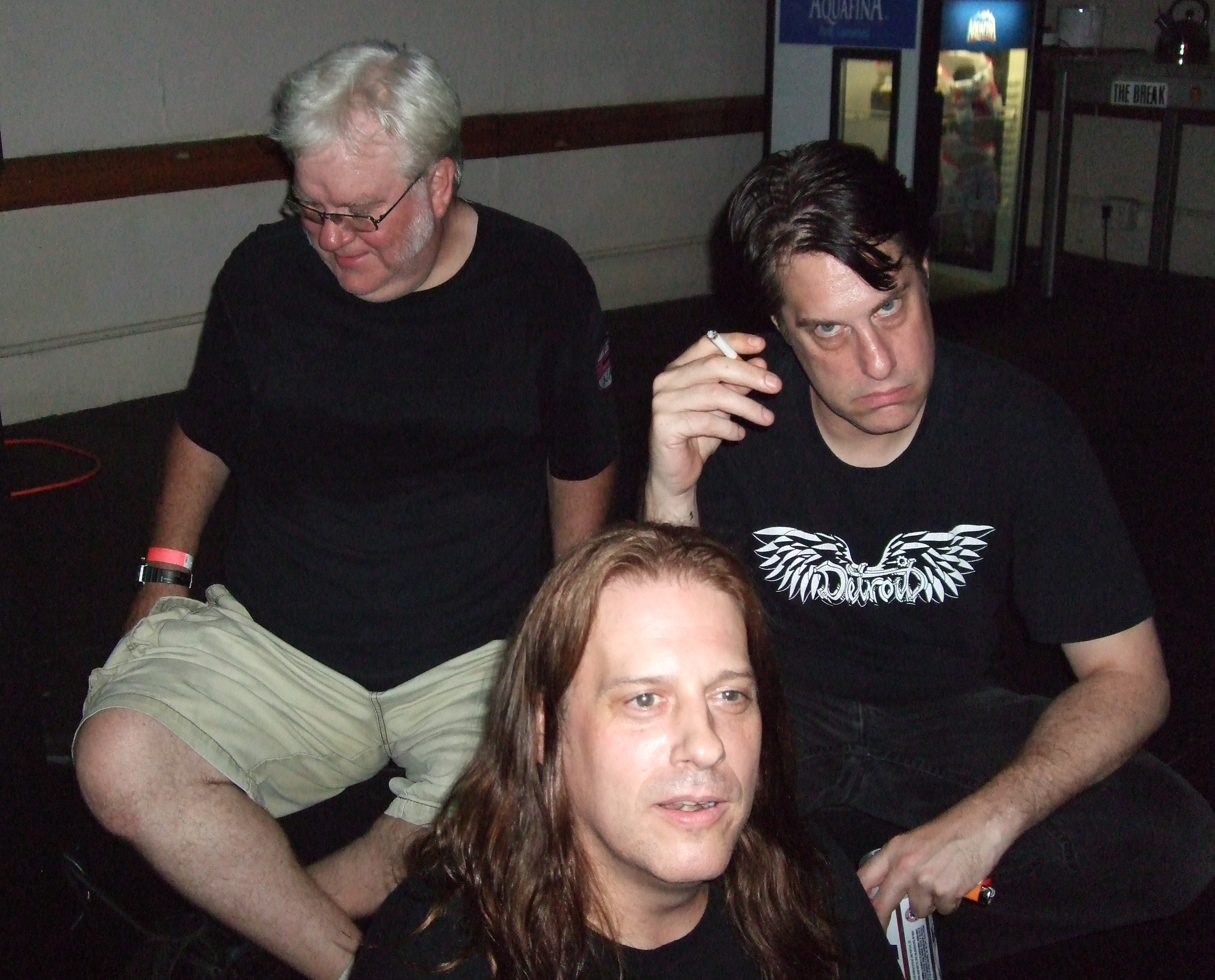
From left: Richard Bowser of Violent Apathy, Scott Boman of the Degenerates & Spite, and John Brannon of Negative Approach.

=== Tom Fuller ===
Guitarist, Tom "Tommy" Fuller performed with Black Spring from 1989 to 1995. Black Spring released their album Girth in 1992. In 2001 Fuller played guitar on the Aliens, Psychos & Wild Things, Vol. 2 CD, which was on the Arcania International label. In 2005, he released his solo album, Chasing an Illusion on Red Cap Records. Fuller also appears on Makin' the Point by Frankie and the Knockouts. Another 2005 appearance is with Twisted Sister on their Live at Wacken: The Reunion DVD. This DVD was produced by Eagle Vision USA. Most recently (June 2007), Tom Fuller has rejoined Violent Apathy on their Twenty Five Year Reunion Tour.

=== Greg Fox ===
Spite was also a springboard for the band's other guitarist, Greg Fox. Fox also played guitar on a 2004 release by The '89 Cubs called, There Are Giants in the Earth, which was recorded on the Slowdance Records label.

=== Scott Boman ===
The vocalist, Scott Boman, also wrote opinion columns in the Western Herald (Western Michigan University publication), was founder of Fellowship of the Purple Cube and is a perennial Michigan Libertarian Party politician. Most recently, Boman has been involved in spoken word performances. This includes performances in 2009 and 2017 when he was featured in Detroit's Annual Erotic Poetry and Music Festival. This "eclectic celebration of the erotic arts" is a charitable event for Paws with a Cause. Paws with a Cause pairs shelter dogs with disabled human companions.

=== Bill Axe ===
After Spite was dissolved, drummer Bill "Willie" Axe performed with bassist Dan Humiston in Memories of Tomorrow. Then, from 1991 to 1995, Axe played drums for Rollinghead. Rollinghead released their CD Daddyhorse in 1991 on the Piranha Alley Records label, and in 1994 they released Vol.3 Live via the Grass Records and Roundflat Records labels.

=== Dan Humiston ===
Bass player, Dan "Danno" Humiston went on to perform with the bands, Shroud of Secrecy and Memories of Tomorrow(1989). Memories of Tomorrow performed with Soundgarden at the state theater during its Louder than Love tour. Humiston also recorded and engineered the CD, Racecar 1991 by Overman, the work was of such interest that it was later remastered as Racecar 2003.

== Discography ==
- The Emotion not the Point

Though Spite performed in the 1980s, they did not release their work on CD until 2007, when they released, The Emotion Not The Point. Songs include: "Bored", "Our Backyard", "Andy's Gone", and "Bowser Rules".
