= The Hungry Brain =

Non-fiction book by Stephan J. Guyenet

- Author: Stephan J. Guyenet
- Language: English
- Publisher: Flatiron books
- Publication date: February 7, 2017
- Publication place: United States
- Media type: Print (hardcover)
- Pages: 304
- ISBN: 1-250-08119-X

The Hungry Brain: Outsmarting the Instincts That Make Us Overeat is a 2017 non-fiction book by Stephan J. Guyenet. Guyenet describes the mechanisms by which the brain regulates diet.

== Reviews ==
Publishers Weekly called it "insightful and important". Kirkus Reviews called it "a helpful guide offering encouragement to those looking for ways to lead healthier lives". A review published by the British Association for Psychopharmacology called it "an excellent, timely and very important book". It was also reviewed by The New York Times.
