= Here Today (Violent Apathy album) =

EP by Violent Apathy
- Released: 1983
- Recorded: 1983
- Genre: Hardcore Punk
- Label: Gravelvoice; Touch and Go
- Producer: Scott Colburn

Professional ratings
Review scores
| Source | Rating |
|---|---|
| Allmusic | 4/5 stars |

Here Today is an extended play released by the hardcore punk band Violent Apathy.

== Track list ==
1. "Bought and Sold"
2. "Scathed"
3. "Here Today"
4. "Black Sorrow"
5. "Possession"
6. "La Bamba"

== Personnel ==
- Andy Bennett II – drums
- Richard Bowser – guitar
- Tom Fuller – guitar
- Kenny Knott – vocals
- Eric Lorey – bass guitar
