= Negative Approach =

American hardcore punk band

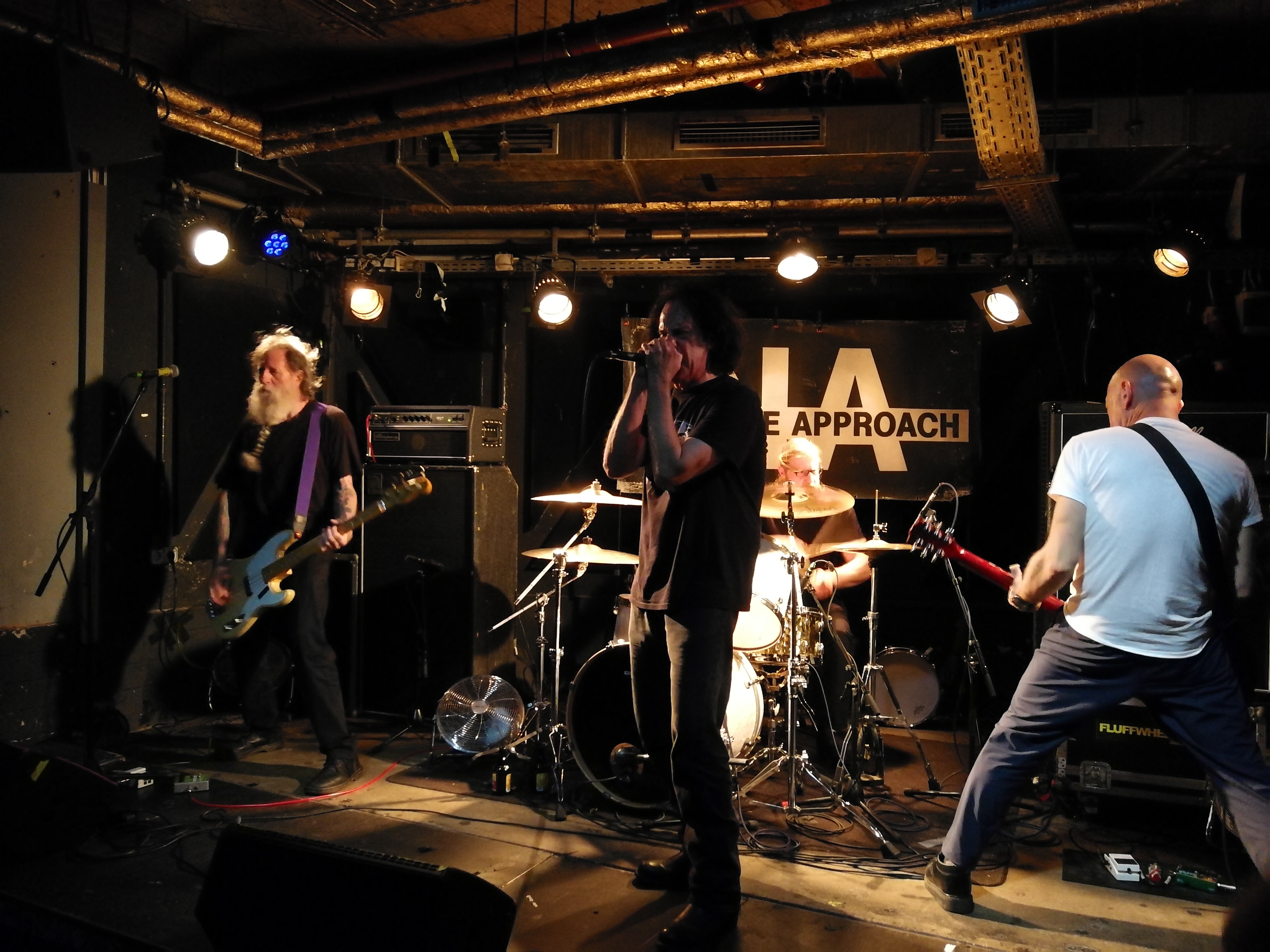
- Negative Approach, Hamburg 2024

Background information
- Origin: Detroit, Michigan
- Genres: Hardcore punk
- Years active: 1981–1984, 2006–present
- Labels: Touch and Go, Reptilian Records, Taang!
- Members: John Brannon; John Lehl; Harold Richardson; Ron Sakowski
- Past members: Pete Zelewski; Zuheir Fakhoury; Rob McCulloch; Graham McCulloch; Kelly Dermody; Dave; Mike McCabe; Chris "Opie" Moore

Negative Approach is an American hardcore punk band, formed in Detroit, Michigan in 1981. The band is considered among the pioneers of hardcore punk, particularly in the Midwest region. Like most hardcore bands, Negative Approach was little known in its day outside of its hometown. It is now idolized in the Detroit rock underground and the punk subculture, considered to be one of the elite bands of the "old school" era, and continues to be influential. Negative Approach initially broke up in 1984 with singer John Brannon moving on to the Laughing Hyenas, and later Easy Action, but the band has reformed as of 2006 and continues to tour sporadically.

== Biography ==
=== Main career (1981–1983) ===
Negative Approach was formed in August 1981 in Detroit by Brannon and Pete Zelewski, supposedly after seeing a Black Flag/Necros show. The first NA lineup consisted of Brannon on vocals, Rob McCulloch on guitar, Pete Zelewski on bass and Zuheir Fakhoury on drums. Not long after, Zelewski left the band to form the Allied and was replaced by McCulloch's brother Graham. Fakhoury was later replaced by Chris "Opie" Moore. The lineup of Brannon/McCulloch/McCulloch/Moore would remain unchanged until NA disbanded.

NA's first gig was in the basement of Necros drummer Todd Swalla's mother's home. Soon after, they recorded a demo, and followed that up with an appearance on the Process of Elimination compilation 7-inch EP, released on Meatmen frontman Tesco Vee's fledgling Touch and Go label, named after his fanzine of the same name. The comp also featured the Meatmen and Necros, among others. NA, the Meatmen and Necros then embarked on the Process of Elimination tour. Although this "tour" consisted of a mere three shows (Boston, New York City and Washington), it is cited as being a key event in the early spread of hardcore.

The first proper Negative Approach studio release came in 1982 with their self-titled 7-inch EP, also on Touch and Go. It contained "Can't Tell No One," "Ready to Fight" and "Nothing", the latter considered by many to be the quintessential NA song.

The following year saw the release of the Tied Down album, also venerated as a hardcore classic.

The classic lineup fell apart in 1983. Rob McCulloch claims that the band had grown weary of the group's reputation for writing negative lyrics but that Brannon was not comfortable writing differently. Also, McCulloch stated that Brannon's involvement with Larissa Stolarchuk from L-Seven was another source of tension for the group. The band regrouped long enough to record the Tied Down album, then split for good.

Afterwards, Brannon assembled a new lineup with members Kelly Dermody (guitar), Dave (bass) and Mike McCabe (drums). This version of Negative Approach played a series of live shows throughout 1984 which featured some new songs, such as "Obsession", "Tunnel Vision", "Kiss Me Kill Me" and a cover of "I Got a Right" by the Stooges. This lineup was documented on the Live at the Newtown Theater bootleg 7-inch and some live tracks recorded at Boston's Paradise Rock Club that appeared on the Total Recall CD collection. The new lineup split during the first week of their tour in support of Tied Down, playing their last show in Memphis.

=== Post-breakup (1983–2006) ===
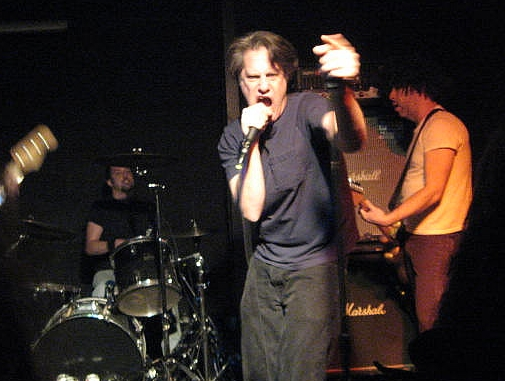
Brannon with Easy Action at Mac's Bar, Lansing, Michigan on November 8, 2008

Brannon went on to front the punk blues band Laughing Hyenas with his girlfriend Stolarchuk (then calling herself "Larissa Strickland"), and sings for Easy Action. In 2008, Brannon recorded vocals for two songs on Vitamin X's album Full Scale Assault, recorded by Steve Albini.

Moore moved out from behind the drums to front alt-rock act Crossed Wire along with Rob McCulloch. After Crossed Wire, McCulloch attended college and has not pursued a career in music, although he maintains a home recording studio. Moore later embarked on a respected solo career as a roots-oriented singer and songwriter. His band Moore & Sons, featuring Lambchop member Dennis Cronin, signed to the UK's Triumphant Sounds/Drawing Room label.

Graham McCulloch moved to Washington, DC and joined the Meatmen, before forming Earth 18 with Jon "Bubba" Dupree (formerly of Void). Earth 18 released several albums and toured the US, opening for Nitzer Ebb. After Earth 18 disbanded, McCulloch played for several years in Mother May I.

=== Reunion (2006–present) ===
In May 2006, it was announced that Brannon and Moore would play a Negative Approach reunion show of sorts, for Touch and Go's 25th anniversary show on September 9, 2006, as well as two later shows in the UK (London on December 7 and at All Tomorrow's Parties on December 10). Rob and Graham McCulloch did not join the reunion after Brannon and Moore "kind of ran into some problems" with them; "I got on the phone with Rob, hadn’t really talked to him in years, and by the second phone call he was calling me a fucking asshole. So, that was just not going to work." It was instead announced that Harold Richardson (of Easy Action) and Ron Sakowski (formerly of Easy Action, Laughing Hyenas and Necros) would complete the lineup.

Negative Approach closed out the No Fun Fest in Brooklyn, New York on May 20, 2007. Thurston Moore played guitar on two songs at the start of their set.

The band did a brief reunion tour in the northeast United States in April 2008, performing in Brooklyn and Providence. They also played the wedding of Anal Cunt founder Seth Putnam. The band did a lengthier tour of Europe in June 2008, and later that year, a concert in Los Angeles. In 2009, they played a string of shows in the U.S.

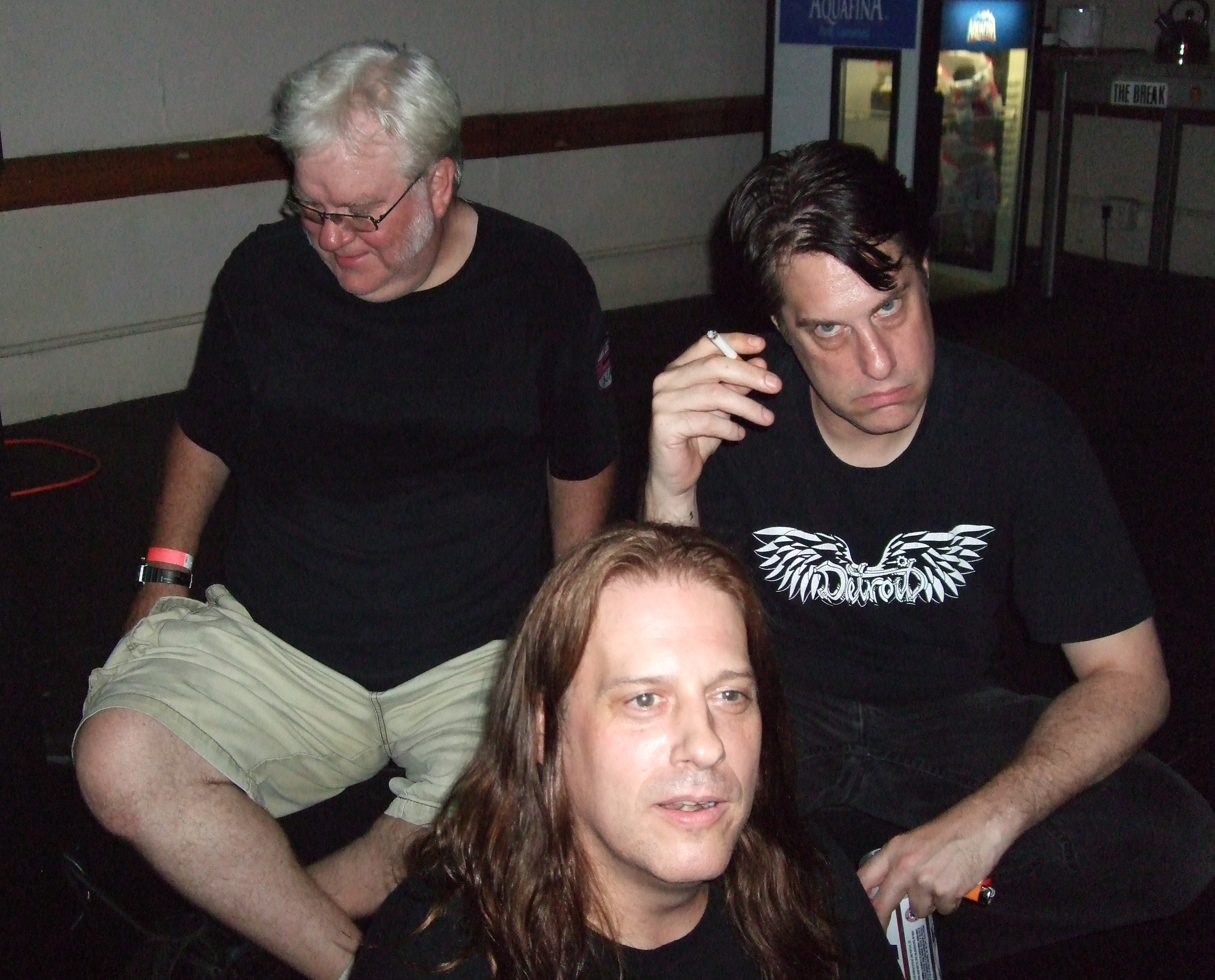
From left: Richard Bowser of Violent Apathy, Scott Boman of the Degenerates and Spite, and John Brannon of Negative Approach. Picture taken at the St. Andrews Hall show on July 31, 2010

On July 31, 2010, Negative Approach played a book release party for Tony Rettman's Why Be Something That You're Not at St. Andrew's Hall in Detroit with other bands reflecting the formative years of the Midwest hardcore scene such as Tesco Vee's Hate Police, Sorcen, Violent Apathy and Hellmouth. The book was titled after a Negative Approach song, and included interviews with artists from the Detroit hardcore scene. The tour also featured the signing of the book Touch and Go: The Complete Hardcore Punk Zine '79–'83 written by Vee and Dave Stimson and edited by Steve Miller.

In 2010, Brannon discovered several unreleased Negative Approach recordings, including the lost 1984 sessions of unreleased studio tracks. After meeting Brannon, Curtis Casella of Taang! Records offered to release the recordings, which include "Friends of No One", "Cargo Cult" "Kiss Me Kill Me", "Obsession", "Genocide" and a studio version of "I Got a Right". The tapes were brought to Jim Diamond to restore and preserve. In November 2011, Taang! released the recordings on the Nothing Will Stand in Our Way album, around the time that the band played the Fun Fun Fun Fest in Austin with former Swirlies drummer Anthony DeLuca manning the kit in place of Moore. This lineup toured extensively throughout 2012 including a month in the U.S. with Off! and a month in Europe with Punch.

== Influences and style ==
Negative Approach's musical style was based on Detroit proto-punk icons the Stooges. Of the Stooges' guitarist Ron Asheton, John Brannon said, "So much of what NA stands for; our sound and lyrics were based on the music which he helped to create."

NA were also influenced by high-octane British hardcore punk (especially Discharge) and Oi! music (Blitz, 4-Skins, Sham 69, etc.), although from the start, their sound and demeanor were considerably more aggressive and brutal than that of their influences. NA's brand of hardcore was savage and nihilistic, exuding frustration, pessimism, and rage. This was personified in vocalist Brannon, an intimidating and intense young man with a shaved head, piercing stare, and belligerent attitude. His vocal style and stage presence set the standard for those that followed.

== Band members ==
Current

- John Brannon – vocals (1981–1984, 2006–present)
- Harold Richardson – guitars (2006–present)
- Ron Sakowski – bass (2006–present)
- John Lehl – drums (2006–present)

Former

- Rob McCulloch – guitars (1981–1983)
- Graham McCulloch – bass (1981–1983)
- Pete Zelewski – bass (1981)
- Zuheir – drums (1981)
- Chris "Opie" Moore – drums (1981–1983, 2006)

Touring

- Kelly Dermody – guitars (1984)
- Dave – bass (1984)
- Mike McCabe – drums (1984)
- Anthony DeLuca – drums (2011/2012)
- Chuck Burns – drums (2013)

== Discography ==
=== Studio albums ===
- Tied Down (1983, Touch and Go Records)

=== EPs ===
- Negative Approach 7-inch/CD EP (1982, Touch and Go Records)
- Friends of No One (recorded 1984) 7-inch/CD EP (2010, Taang! Records)

=== Demos ===
- 1st Demo (May 1981)
- Lost Cause Demo (August 1981)
- EP Demo First Version (late 1981/early 1982)
- Tied Down Demo (aka Rice City Demo) (June 1983)

=== Compilation albums ===
- Total Recall (1992, Touch and Go)
- Ready to Fight: Demos, Live and Unreleased 1981-83 (2005, Reptilian)
- Nothing Will Stand in Our Way (2011, Taang! Records)

=== Videos ===
- Fair Warning, Vol. 1 (2006)
- Fair Warning, Vol. 2 (2007)
- Can't Tell No One (2008)

=== Other appearances ===
- "Lost Cause" on Process of Elimination 7-inch EP (1981, Touch and Go Records)
- "Can't Tell No One" on Reagan Regime Review (1992, Selfless)
- "Sick of Talk" on Sugar Daddy Live Split Series Vol. 5 split 12-inch with the Melvins, Die Kreuzen and Necros (2012, Amphetamine Reptile)
- "Borstal Breakout" on Bash 13 10-inch split EP (2013, Amphetamine Reptile)
- "Friend or Foe" on American Hardcore: The History of American Punk Rock 1980-1986 Original Soundtrack (2006, Rhino Entertainment)
