= It Lies Within =

American metalcore band

- Origin: Flint, Michigan
- Genres: Metalcore, electronicore, deathcore
- Years active: 2008–present
- Label: Luxor Records
- Members: Zachary Scott; Danny Rangel; Kyle Dameron; Justin Dimarco
- Website: It Lies Within on Facebook

It Lies Within is an American metalcore band from Flint, Michigan, founded in 2008.

== Background ==
The band formed late 2008 in Flint, Michigan. The band signed to Luxor Records in 2011 and has toured with The Browning, Conquer Divide, In Dying Arms, plus many more, as well as opening shows with Hatebreed, Attila, Bullet for My Valentine, Chiodos, Nonpoint, and Asking Alexandria, as well as several other local bands and fellow label-mates.

In 2015, the band released "Never Surrender". Tyler Smith of The Word Alive and Ryan Kirby of Fit for a King were featured on the album, giving the band a new momentum. The band has played at several festivals, including Dirt Fest, where the band shot their video for "Trust In Yourself".

== Members ==
Current

- Zachary Scott – Vocals (2008–present)
- Kyle Dameron - Guitars (2015–present)
- Justin DiMarco - Bass, Clean Vocals (2017–present)
- Danny Rangel - Drums (2017–present)

Former

- Matthew Groshart - Guitars, Vocals (2008-2017)
- Michael Singh - Guitars (2008-2015)
- Erik Mckay - Bass, Clean vocals (2015 - 2017)
- Randy McClaughry - Bass, Vocals (2008-2014)
- Kamron Mead - Drums (2008-2017)

== Discography ==
=== Studio albums ===
- Chrysalis (2012)
- Paramount (2016)

=== Singles ===
- Reap What You Sow (2015)
- Victorious (2016)
- Static Slaves (2017)
- Attention (2018)
