= Degenerates =

American punk rock band

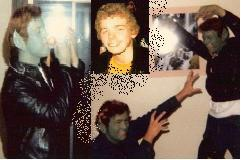
- Composite of primary members: Scott "Scotty" Boman plays Pan (left), John Butterfield kneels before Robin Corley, (bottom center); Rob Vansile abstains from the Namtons Costume (upper center)

Background information
- Origin: Grosse Pointe Park, Michigan
- Genres: Punk rock
- Years active: 1979– 1987
- Label: CD Baby
- Past members: Scott Boman : Vocals; John Butterfield : Bass guitar Robin Corley : Guitar; Rob Vansile : Drums; Dena Wills : Guest Drums; John Collins : Upright Bass
- Website: Official website

Degenerates is a musical group which originated in Grosse Pointe Park, Michigan in 1979, during the formative years of the Detroit hardcore scene. The group predated the Process of Elimination EP, which some reviewers view as the beginning of the Midwest hardcore scene. Members branched out to other bands, including Dualtone Records recording artist Mike Mangione & the Union, and the Kalamazoo-based band Spite. Degenerates vocalist Scott Boman became a much noted libertarian politician.

This group was composed of: Scott Boman (Vocals & noise makers), John Butterfield (Bass & Vocals), Robin Corley (Guitar & vocals), Robert Vansile (Drums), as well as Guest Artists: Dana Wills (Drums) & John Collins (Stand-up Bass).

They did not release their work on CD until their self-titled release in 2006. Songs include: Pseudo Scientist, Armageddon, Let's Start a War!, and Teenage Rockstar.

== Later Projects of Members ==
The Degenerates upright bass player, John Collins also recorded with Spanking Bozo their song “I Don't Understand You” was recorded on the Wanghead With Lips compilation It came from the Garage I (1986), and their song “Tell Me something” was recorded on the compilation Maniacs from the Motor City which was produced on the 44 Caliber Records label in 1989 (later distributed by Headline Records), and featured the band Inside Out. While with Spanking Bozo Collins also recorded their first complete CD, McFly on the 44 Caliber Records label (1993).

In 2004 Collins provided bass and vocals for the self-titled CD by the Pindrops. More recently, he was recorded on the CD “Tenebrae” by Mike Mangione and has been performing as a member of Mangione's group, “Mike Mangione & the Union,” which has recorded a self-titled work in 2010.

According to a bio on the Mike Mangione Page,

“When John was younger he wrote a substantial amount, and sang lead, of and on the material he was performing. Now, he gets even greater satisfaction from writing a part that augments and grounds the music of others.”

The Degenerates lead vocalist, Scott Boman, went on to attend Western Michigan University, and sing with the Kalamazoo band Spite. Most recently, Boman has been involved in spoken word performances. This includes performances in 2009 and 2017 when he was featured in Detroit's Annual Erotic Poetry and Music Festival. This "eclectic celebration of the erotic arts" is a charitable event for Paws with a Cause. Paws with a cause pairs shelter dogs with disabled human companions. Boman has also been exploring the visual arts. In the Summer of 2012 he displayed art work in the “Educators Create WCCCD Faculty Art Exhibition,” which was hosted by Wayne County Community College District where he teaches Physics and Physical science. He is also a veteran libertarian activist and perennial candidate.

Member Robert VanSile is brother of Grosse Pointe notable Norman B. VanSile.

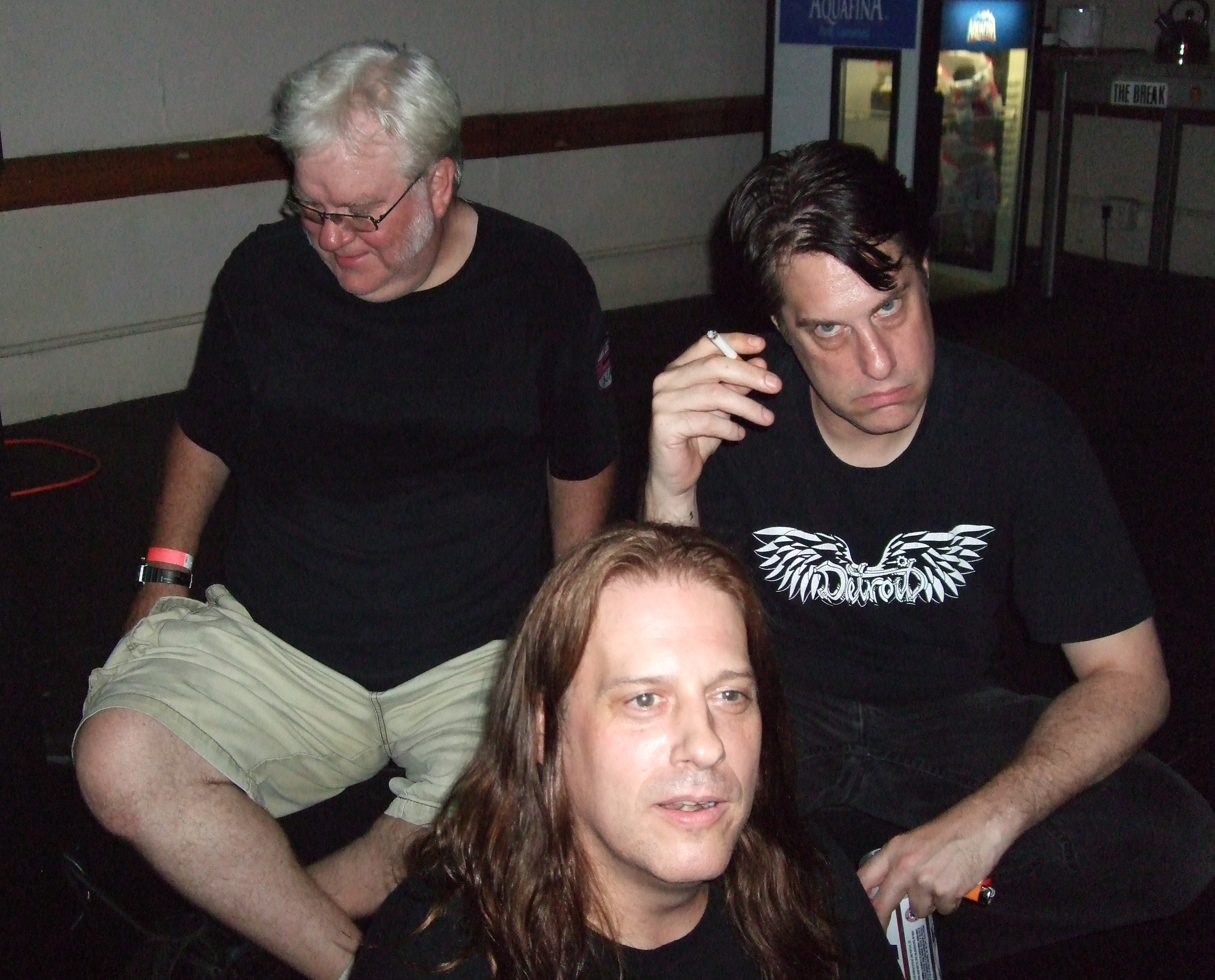
From left: Richard Bowser of Violent Apathy, Scott Boman of the Degenerates & Spite, and John Brannon of Negative Approach.

== Discography ==
- Degenerates (2006)
- Armageddon (2008). A recently released Video of a performance recorded in 1981.

=== Discography featuring former members ===
- It came from the Garage I (Spanking Bozo, 1986)
- Maniacs from the Motor City (Spanking Bozo, 1989)
- McFly (Spanking Bozo, 1993)
- Pindrops (Pindrops, 2004)
- The Emotion Not The Point (Spite, 2007)
- Tenebrae (Mike Mangione, 2007)
- Mike Mangione & the Union (Mike Mangione & the Union, 2010)

== Name distinction ==
The 1979 group “Degenerates” is distinct from the 1979 Houston band of the same name and a more recent New York based group, “The Degenerates" that started in 2001. The New York group changed their name to Fairway.
