= Violent Apathy =

American band

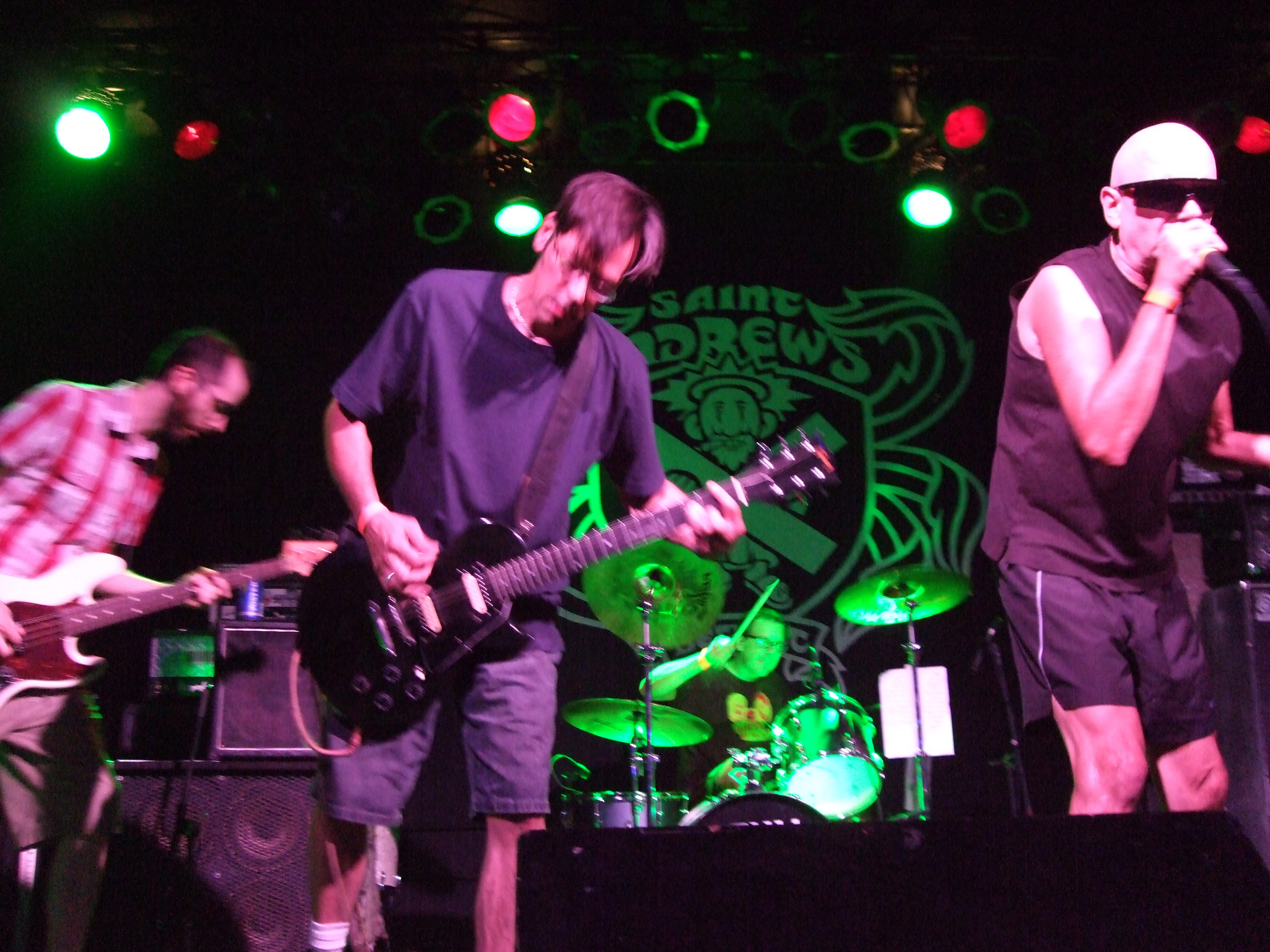
- Violent Apathy at St. Andrews Hall on July 31, 2010. Left to right: J.C. Graves, Tommy Fuller, Eliot Rachman, and Kenny Knott. (Richard (Dick) Bowser present, not shown)

Background information
- Origin: Kalamazoo, Michigan, U.S.
- Genres: Punk rock, Hardcore punk
- Years active: 1981– present
- Labels: Touch and Go, Gravelvoice, Lost & Found, and Affirmation
- Members: Kenny Knott : Vocals; Richard (Dick) Bowser : guitar Tommy Fuller : guitar Eliot Rachman: drums J.C. Graves : Bass
- Past members: Jim Forgey : bass Todd Visser : Bass; Eric Lorey : Bass; Andy Bennett: drums
- Website: Official website

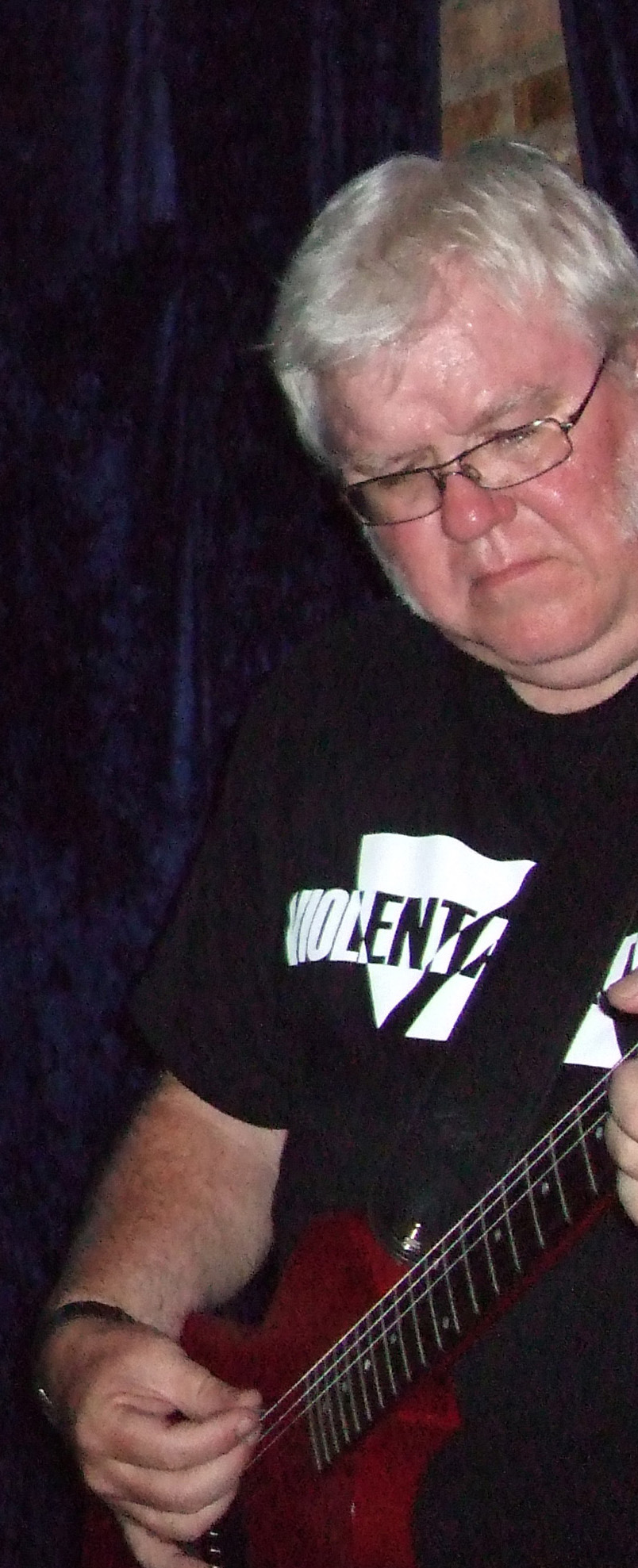
Richard Bowser at The Strutt July 30th, 2010.

Violent Apathy is an American hardcore band that formed in March 1981 at Western Michigan University in Kalamazoo, Michigan, United States, and sparked the Kalamazoo hardcore scene. The original band was three high school friends from Jackson, Michigan (Kenny Knott, Richard "Dick" Bowser, and Jim Forgey) along with Eliot Rachman, another WMU student who hailed from East Lansing. Rachman had worked on the 1980 United States Census in Lansing, MI with members of The Fix and the original publishers (Tesco Vee and Dave Stimson) of Touch and Go magazine. He introduced the other members of the band to the then very new music of the Fix, the Necros, and Negative Approach, and all three bands provided a great deal of support and encouragement to VA.

Violent Apathy, through many lineup changes, played numerous shows throughout Michigan, particularly in Detroit, Lansing, Grand Rapids, and Kalamazoo. The band played outside of Michigan only twice, both in 1983, once in Indianapolis and once in Chicago. The Chicago appearance, however, was supposedly attended by a young Dave Grohl of the Foo Fighters and described as a formative experience for him in the book Come as You Are by Michael Azerrad. The band's sound also evolved considerably during its three-and-a-half-year life, moving from primitive thrash to a slower, more rock-oriented sound.

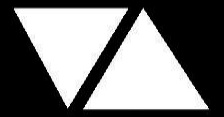
Logo based on stylized abbreviation of the band's name.

== Students for Progressive Action ==
Another significant contribution of singer Kenny Knott and Eliot Rachman was the formation in 1982 of Students for Progressive Action (SPA). Originally started as a scheme for local musicians to get paying gigs from the university. SPA grew quickly and brought many shows to Kalamazoo between 1982 and 1986. Some of the bands that played at SPA shows included Black Flag, Circle Jerks, Saccharine Trust, The Minutemen, Butthole Surfers, Naked Raygun, Discharge, Misfits, Samhain, Minor Threat, and many others. Violent Apathy and many other southwest Michigan bands typically provided opening support at SPA shows.

== Legacy ==
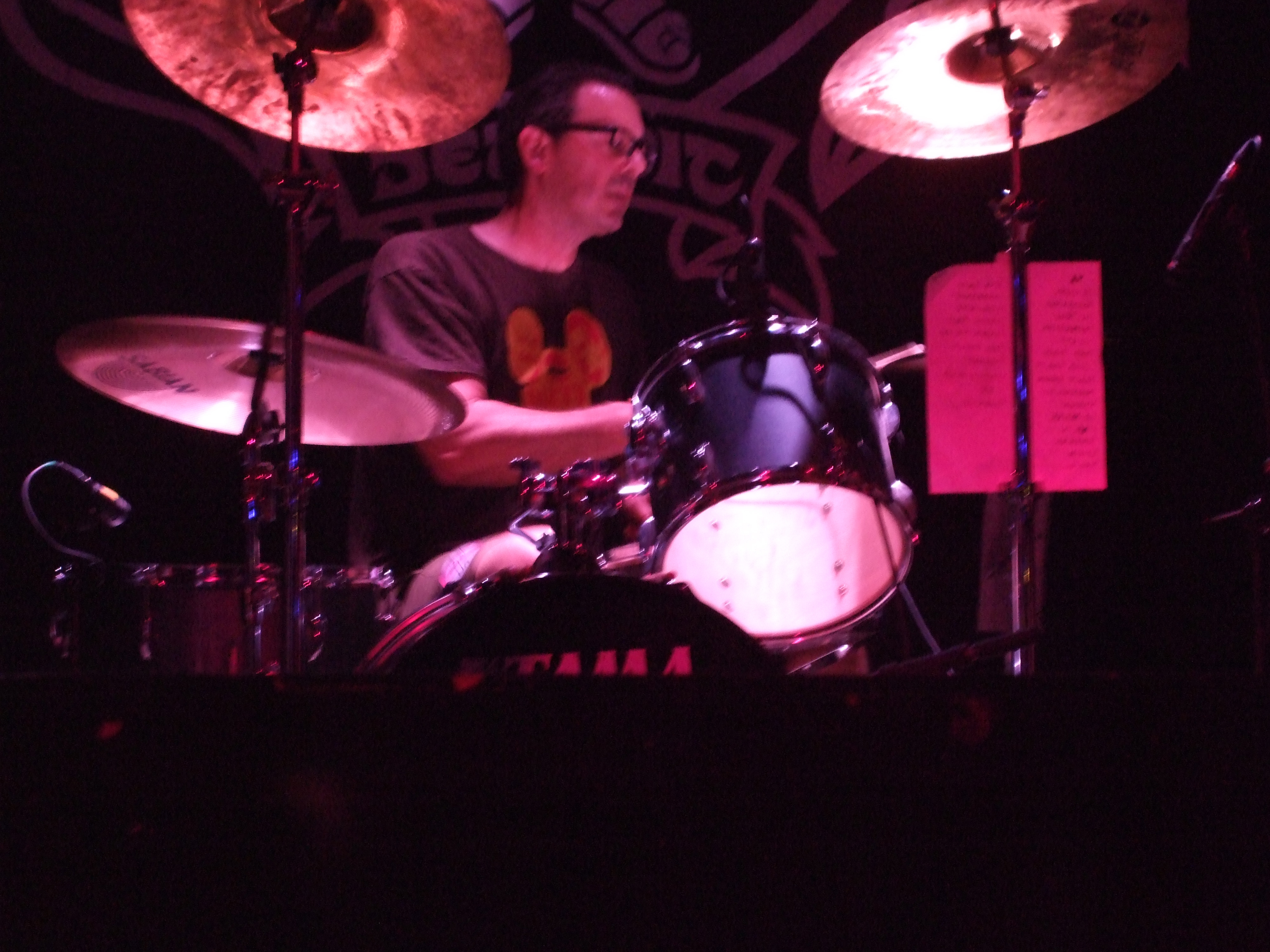
Violent Apathy drummer Eliot Rachman.

Members of Violent Apathy have also been involved in a myriad of other musical endeavors.

Kenny Knott was part of the band Just Say No, who recorded three albums on the Go Ahead Records label, in the late 1980s and went on to front The Monokulators in Lansing, MI.

Tommy Fuller played in Spite from 1984 to 1985, and in Black Spring during the 1990s and currently runs a brewery in Lawton, Michigan.

Rachman and Forgey were part of the original Meatmen. Rachman played with the Virelles, a group that eventually mutated into the God Bullies, another Kalamazoo legend. Also, Bowser and Rachman were part of a band called Dick and the Balls. Rachman also played with the Memphis Pilgrims after moving to New York City.

Knott and Bowser are currently two thirds of the space/noise rock outfit Dr Xeron and the Moogulators.

=== Resurrection ===
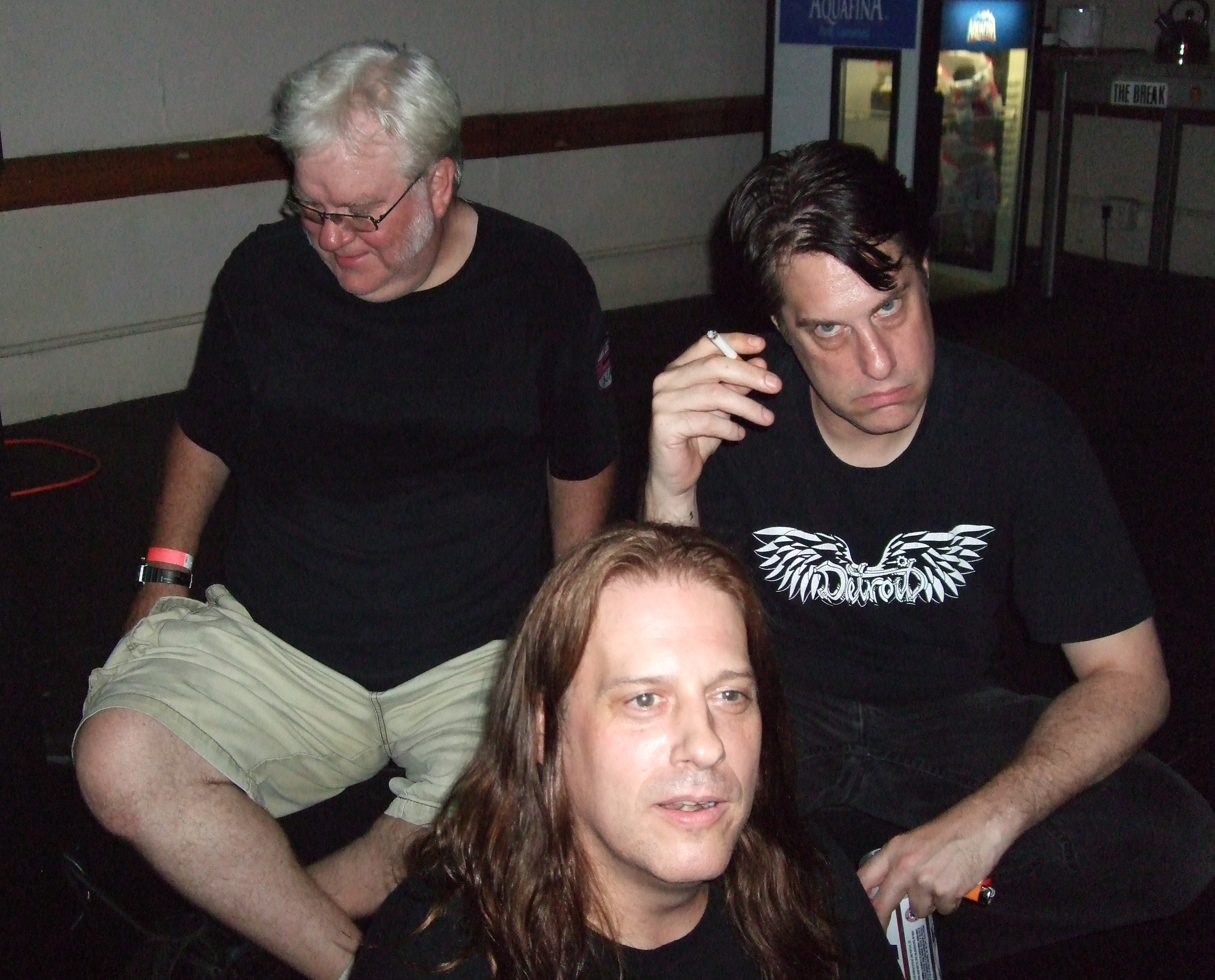
From left: Richard Bowser of Violent Apathy, Scott Boman of the Degenerates & Spite, and John Brannon of Negative Approach.

In June 2007, Violent Apathy reunited for a twenty fifth anniversary reunion tour. Their first public appearance in twenty five years was in Detroit, Michigan at the 2500 Club. This was followed by appearances in Kalamazoo, Chicago, and Lansing.

== Personnel ==
I: March 1981-March 1982

Kenny Knott: vocals
Richard (Dick) Bowser: guitar
Jim Forgey: bass
Eliot Rachman: drums

II: March 1982-December 1982

Kenny Knott: vocals
Richard (Dick) Bowser: guitar
Todd Visser: bass
Eliot Rachman: drums

III: January 1983-August 1983

Kenny Knott: vocals
Richard (Dick) Bowser: guitar
Tommy Fuller: guitar
Todd Visser: bass
Andy Bennett: drums

IV: August 1983-September 1984

Kenny Knott: vocals
Richard (Dick) Bowser: guitar
Tommy Fuller: guitar
Eric Lorey: bass
Andy Bennett: drums

V: June 2007 – 2010

Kenny Knott : Vocals
Richard (Dick) Bowser : guitar
Tommy Fuller : guitar
Eliot Rachman: drums
Karl Knack : Bass

VI: July 2010 reunion shows

Kenny Knott : Vocals
Richard (Dick) Bowser : guitar
Tommy Fuller : guitar
Eliot Rachman: drums
J.C. Graves : Bass

== Discography ==
=== Releases ===
- Here Today - 7" (Gravelvoice, 1983)

=== Bootlegs ===
- Reason - 7" (Lost & Found, 1996)

=== Compilations ===
- Process of Elimination EP (Touch & Go, 1981) "I Can't Take It"
- Charred Remains tape (Noise/Version Sound, 1981) "Real World", "Hunger Strike", "Hypocrite"
- I Estimated Your Worth Today tape (has demo tracks)
- The Master Tapes 2LP (Affirmation, 1983) "Society Rules", "Desperation Takes Hold", "Ignorance is Bliss"
- Hardcore '21 CD (2021 WGBM Records)
