= The Fugitives (band) =

American rock band

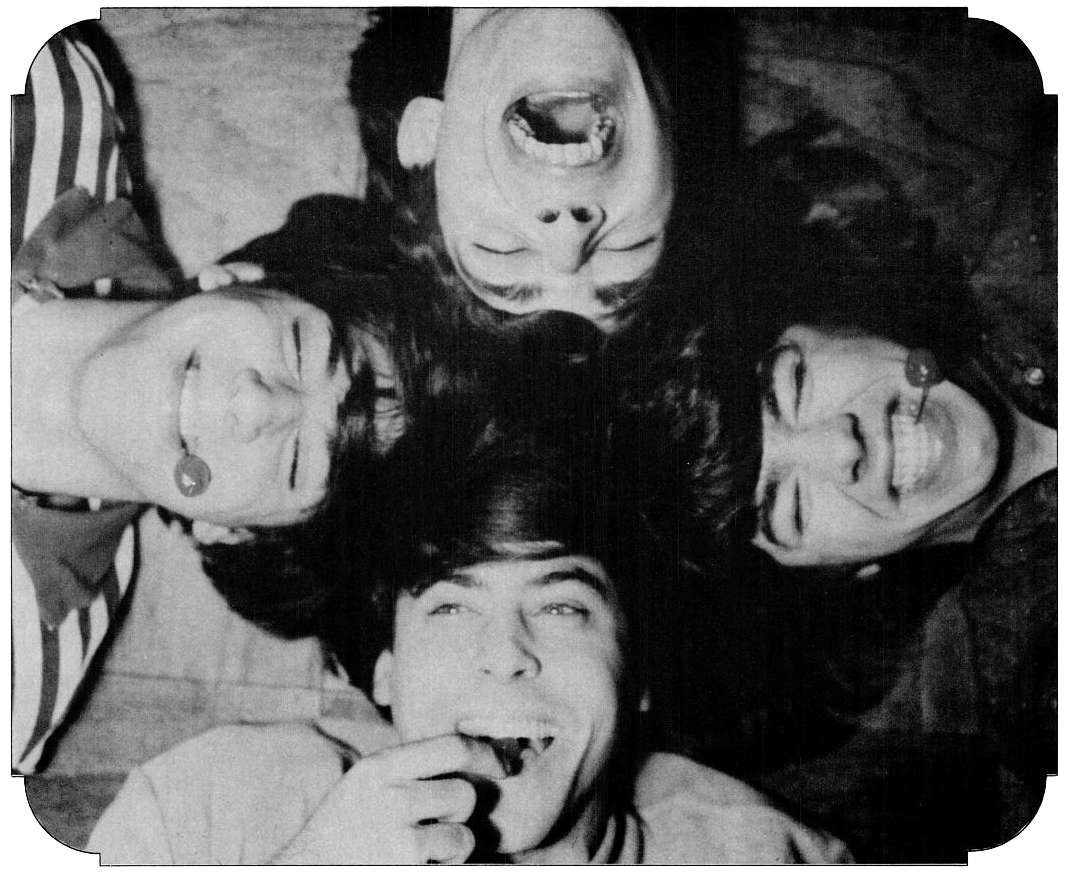
- The Fugitives (1966)

Background information
- Origin: Sacramento, California
- Genres: Garage rock, pop rock
- Years active: 1964–1966
- Past members: Paul Huston : Guitar; Jack May : Guitar; Jim Phillips : Saxophone, vocals Recorded members Tom Fabian : Drums; Frank Galindo Loscutoff : Vocals; Tony Powell : Guitar and vocals Allen M. Purdy : Bass guitar Laramy Smith : Guitar and vocals

The Fugitives were a Sacramento, California group whose first big success was at the 1964 Surfer's Convention at the State Fairgrounds, when they set the attendance record for Sacramento rock and roll shows. The Fugitives opened for many famous acts, including The Rolling Stones, The Byrds, The Kinks, The Beau Brummels and Paul Revere and the Raiders. The band was formed in 1964 by Jim Phillips.

== Background ==
After making a number of personnel changes (lead singer and both guitarists), the band's style had changed to pop rock, and they headed to Los Angeles. They recorded nine songs at Western Recorders (as The Grimfacqles) with The Beach Boys' engineer, Chuck Britz. The band's manager, Dan Steward, tried to interest a major label in the Western sessions but was met with indifference. Those recordings subsequently disappeared and have remained lost despite several research attempts to find them.

The band later returned to Los Angeles to appear on the nationwide television show, Hollywood A Go-Go. They returned to Northern California, where the band was a wildly popular center of the Davis-Sacramento music scene and known throughout Northern California for their playing of originals and cover versions of The Beatles and other top rock groups. Their success continued until the band finally broke up in late 1966, but not before the remarkable energy they expressed was captured. An early 2-track recording of The Fugitives' high-energy "Blowin' My Mind", written by the group's Laramy Smith and Allen M. Purdy, recorded in Sacramento at Bill Rase/Ikon Studios and engineered by Eirik Wangberg, was selected for inclusion on the CD The Sound of Young Sacramento, a compilation released in the UK in 2000 that was put together by Alec Palao for the London, England-based company, Ace Records, a subsidiary of Big Beat Records.

On May 11, 2007, The Fugitives were honored again when the Sacramento Archives and Museum Collection Center (SAMCC) released a 45 rpm vinyl record of four songs by four influential 1960s-era Sacramento bands for the exhibit, "Hearing our History". The Fugitives' "Blowin' My Mind" is one of the four tracks on the record, and a photo of The Fugitives band is on the SAMCC vinyl's cover.

After the band split up, Smith released a record on ATCO produced by David Briggs, Neil Young's producer. In 1968 Smith produced a number of recordings with his group Phoenix including "Los Angeles" co-produced with Laramy's long time pal Eirik Wangberg, Paul McCartney's producer, recorded at Sound Recorders in Hollywood, with ex-Byrd Gene Clark, featured on M 1998 album title 'Flying High". Gene Clark moved on to Dillard & Clark and in 1972 Smith created yet another band, Arizona with Sneaky Pete Kleinow, pedal steel king of The Flying Burrito Brothers. In 1974 Smith moved on to Europe, where for 26 years he toured 16 countries and released recordings on Columbia and EMI records. Smith is active in the music industry. Allen M. Purdy is a real estate mogul in northern California. Frank Gallindo Loscutoff, who retained The Fugitives band name, is a musician in Sacramento.
