= Your Choice Live Series =

Live album by Helios Creed
- Released: March 15, 1994
- Recorded: February 25th, 1993 at The Effenaar in Eindhoven, Netherlands
- Genres: Space rock, industrial rock
- Length: 52:26
- Label: Your Choice

Helios Creed chronology
Kiss to the Brain (1992)	Your Choice Live Series (1994)	Busting Through the Van Allan Belt (1994)

Professional ratings
Review scores
Source	Rating
Allmusic	2.5/5 stars

Your Choice Live Series is a live album by Helios Creed, released on March 15, 1994 through Your Choice Records.

== Track listing ==
All tracks are written by Helios Creed, except where noted.

No.	Title	Writer(s)	Length
1.	"Nirbasion Anasion"		5:33
2.	"Master Blaster"	Helios Creed, Mark Duran, Rey Washam	2:22
3.	"Mountain Mystery"		2:37
4.	"Anubis Warpus"		5:19
5.	"The Beginning"		0:34
6.	"Late Bloomer"	Helios Creed, Jason Finn, Daniel House	3:24
7.	"Ub the Wall"		7:12
8.	"Knockin' on Heaven's Door"	Bob Dylan	2:57
9.	"Monster Lust"		4:55
10.	"Spider"		2:56
11.	"Cat Fight"		3:51
12.	"Who Cares"		10:39

== Personnel ==
Musicians

- Helios Creed – vocals, guitar
- Chris McKay – bass guitar
- Paul Della Pelle – drums
- Z Sylver – synthesizer, sampler

Production and additional personnel

- Daan van der Elsken – mixing, recording
- Peter Reichard – cover art
