= Chrome Box =

Compilation album by Chrome
- Released: December 7, 1982
- Recorded: 1977 – 1982
- Genre: Experimental rock
- Length: 230:49
- Label: Subterranean
- Producer: Helios Creed and Damon Edge

Chrome chronology
3rd from the Sun (1982)	Chrome Box (1982)	No Humans Allowed (1982)

Professional ratings
Review scores
Source	Rating
AllMusic	4.5/5 stars

Chrome Box is a box set by the experimental rock band Chrome, released on December 7, 1982 by Subterranean Records.

== Album listing ==
Album	Release date
Alien Soundtracks	1977
Half Machine Lip Moves	15 March 1979
Blood on the Moon	31 May 1981
No Humans Allowed	1982
The Chronicles I	1982
The Chronicles II	1982
