= Busting Through the Van Allan Belt =

Studio album and Live album by Helios Creed
- Released: April 15, 1994
- Genres: Space rock, industrial rock
- Length: 41:06
- Label: Cleopatra
- Producer: Helios Creed

Helios Creed chronology
Your Choice Live Series (1994)	Busting Through the Van Allan Belt (1994)	X-Rated Fairy Tales/Superior Catholic Finger (1994)

Professional ratings
Review scores
Source	Rating
AllMusic	3/5 stars

Busting Through the Van Allan Belt is the seventh album by Helios Creed, released on April 15, 1994, through Cleopatra Records.

== Track listing ==
All tracks are written by Helios Creed, except "Lactating Purple" co-written by Mark Duran.

No.	Title	Length
1.	"Feelings"	1:14
2.	"Busting Through the Van Allan Belt"	2:37
3.	"Screamer"	1:18
4.	"Alien Lady"	3:23
5.	"Hyperventilation" (live)	4:38
6.	"Late Bloomer" (live)	4:01
7.	"Lactating Purple" (live)	2:54
8.	"Drowning Sin" (live)	12:09
9.	"Bubble Butt" (live)	8:52

== Personnel ==
Musicians

- Helios Creed – vocals, guitar, sampler, percussion, production
- Del Dettmar – synthesizer on "Hyperventilation"
- Paul Fox – bass guitar on "Hyperventilation"
- Tommy Grenas – guitar on "Hyperventilation"
- Chris McKay – bass guitar on "Late Bloomer" and "Lactating Purple"
- Paul Della Pelle – drums on "Hyperventilation", "Late Bloomer" and "Lactating Purple"
- Len Del Rio – keyboards and synthesizer on "Hyperventilation"
- Z Sylver – keyboards
- Nik Turner – saxophone on "Hyperventilation"
- Andrew Weiss – bass guitar on "Drowning Sin" and "Bubble Butt"
- Jon Weiss – drums on "Drowning Sin" and "Bubble Butt"

Production and additional personnel

- Endless – design
