= X-Rated Fairy Tales/Superior Catholic Finger =

Compilation album by Helios Creed
- Released: July 29, 1994
- Recorded: 1985–1989
- Genre: Industrial rock, psychedelic rock, space rock
- Length: 69:51
- Label: Cleopatra
- Producer: Helios Creed

Helios Creed chronology
Busting Through the Van Allan Belt (1994)	X-Rated Fairy Tales/Superior Catholic Finger (1994)	Planet X (1994)

Professional ratings
Review scores
Source	Rating
AllMusic	4.5/5 stars

X-Rated Fairy Tales/Superior Catholic Finger is an anthology by Helios Creed, released on July 29, 1994, through Cleopatra Records. It collects his first two solo works, X-Rated Fairy Tales and Superior Catholic Finger, on one CD.

== Track listing ==
All tracks are written by Helios Creed, except "Mustard Dog" by Mark Duran.

No.	Title	Length
1.	"The Descent"	4:12
2.	"Un-Human Condition"	3:35
3.	"Invitation"	2:53
4.	"X-Rated Fairy Tales"	3:24
5.	"Blood Red"	3:03
6.	"Mystery Room"	4:02
7.	"Showdown"	2:52
8.	"Sex Voodoo Venus"	4:33
9.	"Money Man"	3:41
10.	"Johnny"	3:34
11.	"Monster Lust"	6:15
12.	"Mustard Dog"	1:28
13.	"Superior Catholic Finger"	4:21
14.	"Too Bad"	3:58
15.	"The Bridge"	2:05
16.	"Who Cares"	4:45
17.	"The Cookie Jar"	5:20
18.	"Weekends"	3:49
