= Into the Eyes of the Zombie King =

Studio album by Chrome
- Released: 1984
- Studio: D.B. Studios (Rennes)
- Label: Mosquito
- Producer: Damon Edge

Chrome chronology
| 3rd from the Sun (1982) | Into the Eyes of the Zombie King (1984) |

Into the Eyes of the Zombie King is the seventh studio album by American experimental rock band Chrome, released in 1984 by French record label Mosquito. It was Chrome's first album since the departure of Helios Creed following 1982's 3rd from the Sun. The album was reissued in 1986 on by German label Dossier.

== Reception ==
Professional ratings
Review scores
| Source | Rating |
|---|---|
| AllMusic | 1.5/5 stars |

AllMusic called the album "the first signpost on a dreadful slide for [Damon] Edge into unfortunate obscurity".

== Tracklist ==
All tracks are written by Damon Edge.

Side A
| No. | Title | Length |
|---|---|---|
| 1. | "And Then the Red Sun (The Story of a Cyclops)" | 4:50 |
| 2. | "You Can't Do Anything" | 3:50 |
| 3. | "Walking and Looking for You" | 5:25 |
| 4. | "Into the Eyes of the Zombie King" | 4:15 |

Side B
| No. | Title | Length |
|---|---|---|
| 1. | "Trip the Switch" | 5:33 |
| 2. | "It Wasn't Real" | 4:52 |
| 3. | "Humans in the Rain" | 4:07 |
| 4. | "Don't Move Like That (Don't Dance Like That)" | 3:30 |
