= Where's My Towel/Industry Standard =

Studio album by Big Boys
- Released: June 15, 1981
- Recorded: 1981 at Rampart Recording Studios in Houston, Texas
- Genre: Punk rock, post-punk
- Length: 26:34
- Language: English
- Label: Wasted Talent (JWT-3405); Red C
- Producer: Big Boys, David Bean

Big Boys chronology
Live at Raul's Club (1980)	Where's My Towel/Industry Standard (1981)	Lullabies Help The Brain Grow (1983)

Industry Standard (usually extended to Where's My Towel/Industry Standard) is the debut studio LP by the American punk rock band Big Boys. It was released in 1981 on vinyl through Wasted Talent Records, operated by members of the Judy's. In 2004, the record was reissued on vinyl by Red C Records. It has never been officially released on cassette or CD, although it appears in its entirety on The Skinny Elvis, a retrospective multi-format compilation released by Touch and Go in 1993. The album's title and many of its themes were inspired by a growing dissatisfaction with elements of the Austin, Texas punk rock scene from which the Big Boys had spawned.

== Background ==
In 1980, the infamous Austin club Raul's was sold to Steve Hayden, who implemented several policies that conflicted with the band's ideology, including the banning of cover songs to avoid paying publishing fees. Hayden funded the release of Live at Raul's Club, a split LP with fellow Austin punk rock band the Dicks, hoping the Big Boys' side would receive radio airplay based on its comparatively mild lyrical content. According to guitarist Tim Kerr, Hayden repeatedly justified his management decisions by claiming conformation to an industry standard. The song Complete Control explored the band's relationship with Hayden. Spit was written about another local club, whose owner refused to let them play an agreed upon second set, claiming their stage presence distracted customers from purchasing alcohol. Following the recording of Industry Standard with producer David Bean of The Judy's, the second title Where's My Towel was added to the sleeve after a friend of the band described Kerr's cover artwork with the phrase.

== Track listing ==
No.	Title	Length
1.	"Security"	0:53
2.	"T.V."	2:26
3.	"I Don't Wanna Dance" (lead vocals: Tim Kerr)	2:04
4.	"Identity Crisis"	1:48
5.	"Thin Line" (second guitar: Chris Gates)	3:31
6.	"Advice" (guitar: Chris Gates, bass: Tim Kerr)	1:07
7.	"Complete Control"	3:10
8.	"Work Without Pay" (guitar: Chris Gates, bass: Tim Kerr)	2:34
9.	"Spit"	3:11
10.	"Act/Reaction"	2:36
11.	"Self Contortion"	2:05
12.	"Wise Up" (guitar: Chris Gates, bass: Tim Kerr)	1:15
Total length:		26:34

== Personnel ==
- Randy Turner - lead and backing vocals
- Tim Kerr - guitar, backing and lead vocals, bass
- Chris Gates - bass, backing vocals, guitar
- Greg Murray - drums

Production

- David Bean - producer, engineer
- Big Boys - producers
- Bill Daniels; Beth Kerr - photography
