= Read Only Memory (EP) =

EP by Chrome
- Released: 1979
- Recorded: Alamar Studios, San Francisco, California, United States & Trident Studios, London, England
- Length: 20:31
- Label: Siren; Cleopatra
- Producer: Damon Edge

Chrome chronology
Half Machine Lip Moves (1979)	Read Only Memory (1979)	Red Exposure (1980)

Professional ratings
Review scores
Source	Rating
AllMusic	4/5 stars

Read Only Memory is an EP by the American rock band Chrome, released in 1979 by Siren Records. It was reissued in 2014 by Cleopatra Records.

== Track listing ==
=== Original release ===
All tracks are written by Helios Creed and Damon Edge.

Side A
No.	Title	Length
1.	"You Can't See Them – They Can't Touch You"	3:16
2.	"Inacontact"	5:35
3.	"Read Only Memory"	1:06

Side B
No.	Title	Length
1.	"In Front of the Crowd"	1:10
2.	"I Am the Jaw"	9:24

=== 2014 reissue ===
The 2014 Cleopatra reissue combined both original sides onto side A and added four bonus tracks, recorded from a live performance in Italy in 1981, on side B.

Side B
No.	Title	Length
1.	"Perfumed Metals"	3:41
2.	"Jam 10"	5:40
3.	"Insect Human"	6:48
4.	"Out of Reach"	3:58

== Personnel ==
- Helios Creed – guitar synthesizer, bowed guitar, synthesizer, drum machine, bass guitar, vocals, illustrations
- Damon Edge – synthesizer, guitar synthesizer, tape, drum machine, vocals, production, engineering, illustrations

== Charts ==
Chart (1980)	Peak position
UK Indie Chart	48
