= Glorium =

- Origin: Austin, Texas, United States
- Genres: Post-punk
- Years active: 1991–present
- Members: George Lara, Juan Miguel Ramos, Ernest Salaz, Lino Max, Paul Streckfus
- Website: glorium.bandcamp.com

Glorium was a prolific art punk band that was formed in San Antonio, Texas, in 1991. After moving to Austin, Texas, in 1992, the band released several 7-inch records and albums, many on local Austin independent record labels. The band's music is a blend of post-punk, emo, art rock, classic rock, garage rock, progressive rock and noise rock with a strong DIY ethic.

Glorium toured the United States throughout the 1990s, sharing the stage with diverse acts as Fugazi, At the Drive-In, Lungfish, Slant 6, Jawbreaker, Hoover, Six-Finger Satellite, Spoon, Ruins, Brainiac, Shudder To Think, Seaweed, ...And You Will Know Us by the Trail of Dead, The Grifters, Man or Astroman?, Ed Hall, Trenchmouth and The Meices, playing basements, house shows and clubs while booking their own shows, culminating in opening for Fugazi on their Southeastern tour in 1996 along with Branch Manager. Tim Kerr (of Big Boys, Poison 13, among many others bands) produced the band's third single and first full-length album, Cinema Peligrosa, in 1994.

Glorium stopped in 1997 but still reconvenes to play the occasional show, playing a benefit for the DJ Jonathan Toubin in December 2011 during the last week of Emo's downtown.

== Members ==
- George Lara – bass guitar
- Juan Ramos – drums
- Ernest Salaz – guitar, backing vocals
- Lino Max – guitar, backing vocals
- Paul Streckfus – vocals

== Discography ==
=== Albums ===
- Cinema Peligrosa (1994) Undone Records (produced by Tim Kerr)
- Eclipse (1997) Golden Hour Records
- Past Life Recordings (1997) Existential Vacuum Records
- Close Your Eyes (1998) Golden Hour Records
- Fantasmas (2004) Golden Hour Records

=== Singles ===
- "Divebomb" b/w "Chemical Angel" (1992) Existential Vacuum Records
- "Iced The Swelling" b/w "Fearless" (1992) Unclean Records
- "Hour One & Counting" (1993) Unclean Records split 7-inch with El Santo
- "G93" (1994) Powernap Records split 7-inch with Gut
- "Black Market Hearts" b/w "Walkie-Talkie'" (1997) Golden Hour Records
- "Psyklops" b/w "Future News From The Front Line" (2001) Tranquility Base

=== EPs ===
- Phantom Wire Transmissions (1994) Undone Records, Recorded at Sweatbox, Austin, Texas, Produced by Tim Kerr

=== Cassettes ===
- Demolition EP (1992) self-released
- Dream of the Insect Queen (1995) Bobby J
- Sound Recordings from the Front Room (1995) Golden Hour Records
- Dead Air Station Wagon (1995) Golden Hour Records
- Club Chit Chat (1997) Golden Hour Records

=== Compilation albums ===
- Live at Emo's CD (1994) Rise Records
- Seek Sound Shelter CD (1994) Dot/Zit Records
- Austin Live Houses cassette (1995) Golden Hour Records
- Econo*Pep*Rally cassette(1995) Couchfort Zine
- Crispy Chronicles CD (1996) Speed Records
- Live On KVRX: Local Live Vol. 1 CD (1997) KVRX UT Austin
- Capitol City Signals cassette (1997) Golden Hour Records
- The Eagle Has Landed 2x12" LP (1998) Tranquillity Base (Bryn Mawr, PA)
- Secret Grrrl Conspiracy cassette (2000) Chapter 5
