= Rapeman =

American noise rock band

- Rapeman c. 1988

Background information
- Origin: Chicago, Illinois, U.S.
- Genres: Post-hardcore; noise rock
- Years active: 1987–1989
- Labels: Touch and Go; Blast First; Au Go Go
- Past members: Steve Albini; David Wm. Sims; Rey Washam

Rapeman was an American noise rock band founded in 1987 and disbanded in 1989. It consisted of Steve Albini (formerly of Big Black) on guitar and vocals, David Wm. Sims (formerly of Scratch Acid) on bass and Rey Washam (formerly of Scratch Acid and Big Boys) on drums. In the years since their brief tenure, Rapeman's sound has also been described as post-hardcore.

Rapeman were formed as a sister project to the Jesus Lizard, although the latter outlasted Rapeman by several years.

== History ==
Rapeman was formed in 1987 when drummer Rey Washam and bassist David Wm. Sims relocated to Chicago from Texas after the breakup of their band Scratch Acid. Steve Albini had just ended his group Big Black, and was looking to switch to a musical project with a live drummer, instead of his Roland TR-606 drum machine.

Rapeman's initial 1988 releases included the mostly live recorded Budd EP, the "Hated Chinee" b/w "Marmoset" 7" single, and their sole album, Two Nuns and a Pack Mule. The band recorded in Albini's own home studio, often giving production credit to someone named Fluss, later revealed to be Albini's cat.

All of Rapeman's records were originally released on Touch and Go Records in the US, Blast First in the UK, and Au Go Go in Australia. Rapeman left Blast First in 1990 after Albini had an argument with the label over the release of a Big Black record. Touch and Go started distributing in the UK in 1992 and re-released Rapeman's records there.

The band's final record before their breakup, the "Inki's Butt Crack" instrumental 7" single, was issued in 1989 as part of the Sub Pop Singles Club.

Albini later played bass in live iterations of Pete Conway's solo project, Flour, before going on to form Shellac and expanding his work as a recording engineer. Sims reunited with ex-Scratch Acid vocalist David Yow to form the Jesus Lizard (with Albini recording their albums). Washam went on to drum for former Chrome guitarist Helios Creed. Albini died on May 7, 2024.

=== Name ===
The name Rapeman was taken from the Japanese manga series The Rapeman. Albini discovered the manga through a friend who ran an import business, and found its combination of rape fantasies and the superhero genre "simultaneously utterly repellent and fascinating". He described it as "the product of decades of repression and misogyny being expressed through a different cultural tradition". He named the band in a deliberate attempt to repel audiences and do the "opposite" of bands that were desperate to appear on MTV.

Rapeman's name drew criticism and protests at several gigs. In a 2020 interview on the Conan Neutron's Protonic Reversal podcast, Albini called it a "flippant choice" that was unconscionable and indefensible. He likened it to getting a bad tattoo. In a 2021 interview with MEL Magazine, Albini said he had been ignorant of women's issues and had falsely assumed that many social problems, such as misogyny and homophobia, were already solved. Sims said the name was his biggest musical regret.

== Discography ==
=== Studio albums ===
- Two Nuns and a Pack Mule (1988, Touch and Go Records/Blast First/Au Go Go) UK Indie No. 4

=== Singles and EPs ===
- Budd EP (1988, Touch and Go/Blast First/Au Go Go) UK Indie No. 2
- "Hated Chinee" 7" single (1988, Touch and Go/Blast First/Au Go Go)
- "Inki's Butt Crack" 7" single (1989, Sub Pop Singles Club)

=== Compilation appearances ===
- Nothing Short Of Total War (Part One) (Blast First) (1987) - "Dutch Courage"
- The Devil's Jukebox (Blast First) (1989) - "Dutch Courage"
- Indie Top 20 Vol. VI-Pride Of Independents (Beechwood) (1989) - "Bud(d)"
- Au-Go-Go sampler #1 cassette (Au Go Go) (1989) - "Hated Chinee"
