= Kill from the Heart =

Studio album by Dicks
- Released: 1983
- Genre: Hardcore punk
- Length: 34:40
- Label: SST (017)
- Producer: Spot

Dicks chronology
Live at Raul's Club (1980)	Kill from the Heart (1983)	Peace ? 7" (1984)

Professional ratings
Review scores
Source	Rating
AllMusic	4.5/5 stars

Kill from the Heart is an album by the hardcore punk band Dicks. Widely considered a classic of the genre, it was the band's first full-length album and the last to feature the group's original Texas-based line-up. The album finds the band mixing its hardcore punk style with blues aesthetics.

Tim Kerr of the Big Boys appears on the song "Anti-Klan (Part Two)". "Anti-Klan (Parts One and Two)", "Rich Daddy", "No Nazi's Friend", and "Kill from the Heart" appear on the 1980-1986 CD compilation. The album was reissued on CD & LP by Alternative Tentacles in 2012.

== Track listing ==
All songs written by Dicks except "Purple Haze", written by Jimi Hendrix.

No.	Title	Length
1.	"Anti-Klan (Part One)"	1:53
2.	"Rich Daddy"	2:27
3.	"No Nazi's Friend"	3:09
4.	"Marilyn Buck"	0:58
5.	"Kill from the Heart"	1:57
6.	"Little Boys' Feet"	1:13
7.	"Pigs Run Wild"	2:09
8.	"Bourgeois Fascist Pig"	1:20
9.	"Purple Haze"	3:16
10.	"Anti-Klan (Part Two)"	2:50
11.	"Right Wing/White Ring"	2:00
12.	"Dicks Can't Swim: I. Cock Jam II. Razor Blade Dance"	11:28
Total length:		34:40

=== 2012 Reissue ===
No.	Title	Length
13.	"Dicks Hate the Police"	1:59
14.	"Lifetime Problems"	1:53
15.	"All Night Fever"	1:52
Total length:		40:24

== Personnel ==
- Gary Floyd - Vocals
- Glen Taylor - Guitar, Bass on "No Nazi's Friend" and "Marilyn Buck"
- Buxf Parrot - Bass/Backing Vocals, Guitar on "No Nazi's Friend" and "Marilyn Buck"
- Pat Deason - Drums/Backing Vocals
- Carlos Lowery - Artwork & Design
- Spot - Engineer and Producer
- Tim Kerr - Dobro on "Anti-Klan (Part Two)"
- Backing Vocals on "Anti-Klan (Part Two)" - The Torn Panties (Roxann Flowers, Dolores Aguirre, & Byrd Willey), Phillip Gilbeau, Spot, & Tim Kerr
