= Inner Sanctum Records =

Record shop in Texas, United States

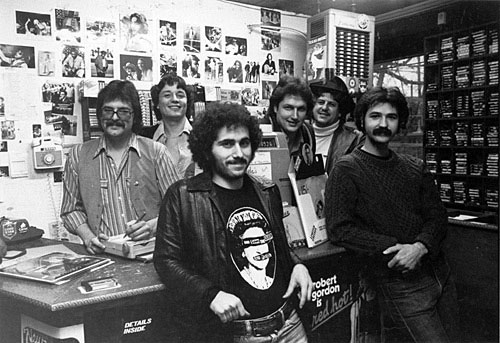
Photograph of the Inner Sanctum Records staff in Austin, Texas, taken in January 1978 -- (L-R) Big Al Ragle, Joe Bryson, Neil Ruttenberg, James "Cowboy" Cooper, Stephen Goodwin, Richard Dorsett.

Inner Sanctum Records was a record shop in Austin, Texas. The retailer was variously cited as the first indie record shop in Texas and, at the time of its closure, the oldest in Central Texas.

== History ==
In 1970, college student/entrepreneur Joe Bryson bought Phil's Record Store, which sat in a shotgun location at W. 24th and Rio Grande Streets, and renamed it Inner Sanctum Records, named after the 1940s radio show. The store would soon relocate to a large, old house at 504 W. 24th Street, just off "The Drag" (Guadalupe St.), near the University of Texas at Austin. This building also housed Aunt Sally's Bookstore, The Leather Bench and other businesses, as well as the offices of the political magazine The Texas Observer (when not running the store, Bryson would often visit the Observer offices in the presence of Molly Ivins and Kaye Northcott).

Bryson increasingly relied on fellow music aficionados to keep the business running. James "Cowboy" Cooper, Gary Barnes, "Big Al" Ragle, Richard Dorsett, Rick Moore, Kirby McDaniel, Stephen Goodwin, and Linda Nozik all worked at the store.

Between Cooper's knowledge and Bryson's enthusiasm, the store created a synergy that helped spawn progressive country. Inner Sanctum became one of the most influential record shops in the United States and the most popular independent store in Austin during the 1970s, coinciding with the emergence of the Southern California sound that influenced many Texas-based artists. The store became a source for recordings by Doug Sahm, Willie Nelson, Gram Parsons, Emmylou Harris, The Lost Gonzo Band, Joe Ely, The Flying Burrito Brothers, Willis Alan Ramsey, Townes Van Zandt, Guy Clark, Waylon Jennings, George Jones, Jerry Jeff Walker, Michael Murphey (later known as Michael Martin Murphey), B. W. Stevenson, Billy Joe Shaver, Kinky Friedman, The Byrds and many others.

The store became more successful and Bryson decided to move into a larger space in the building, but ended up having to keep the current space, as well. Thus, Inner Sanctum Too, was established as an auxiliary shop featuring classical music, and was managed by Kirby McDaniel and David Sobey. Meanwhile, the main store's inventory grew to include the entire spectrum of recorded music, featuring extensive catalog offerings of popular and progressive rock, R&B, soul, blues, disco, jazz and what came to be known as world music. The store was also one of the first in the country to offer second-hand records for purchase. It also started a notorious practice of "renting" records for about $1 a day, a practice quashed by the major record labels when they became aware of it by the latter part of the decade.

== Country to punk ==
As the prog country "Cosmic Cowboy" trend lost momentum, the store staff embraced the growing punk rock trend with zeal. Importers became the store's most important suppliers, with shipments arriving at least once or twice a week with singles, LPs and magazines from the United Kingdom punk scene. Buyer Neil Ruttenberg made punk rock the store's specialty and helped catalyse punk's local popularity. DIY bands began rapidly appearing throughout Austin, which already enjoyed a reputation as a haven for live music. Inner Sanctum became the local source for recordings by artists such as the Sex Pistols, Devo, The B-52's, Joy Division, Throbbing Gristle, Stray Cats, Elvis Costello, The Clash, The Stranglers, Grace Jones, The Police, U2, Tears for Fears, OMD, and Simple Minds.

== Supporting local music ==
As local bands began to record and release their own recordings, they could rely on the Inner Sanctum to stock them. To celebrate, the store would usually host a record release party with a keg and refreshments, lending a feeling of closeness to the scene. Some of these local acts included The Huns, Standing Waves, F-Systems, The Skunks (a band that featured "Fast Eddie" Munoz, a one-time Inner Sanctum employee and later a member of The Plimsouls, and following Munoz' departure, Jon Dee Graham), The Next, Terminal Mind, The Big Boys, The Dicks, The Norvells, Joe "King" Carrasco and the Crowns, D-Day (fronted by De Lewellen), Delta, Radio Free Europe, The Explosives, Kamikaze Refrigerators, Sharon Tate's Baby, The Violators, The Inserts, The Judys (from Houston), and many more. Outside of punk and new wave, parties were held for Uncle Walt's Band (who performed in-store), Alvin Crow, soul band Extreme Heat, Butch Hancock, The Fabulous Thunderbirds, Stevie Ray Vaughan, Greezy Wheels, Roky Erickson, Uranium Savages, Joe Ely, Beto y Los Fairlanes and others. Doug Sahm and his friends frequently patronized the store. Major label recordings were subject to release parties, as well (such as an Elvis Costello Look-A-Like Contest upon the release of My Aim is True), or just a party to celebrate the fact that such artists, like The Plasmatics, Graham Parker, Joe Jackson, Robert Gordon & Link Wray, Tom Robinson Band, Magazine, and The Textones (Carla Olsson and Kathy Valentine), were performing in town.

Most of the staff were also musicians, band managers or otherwise involved with the local music scene. In 1976, McDaniel started a Sunday night radio show, Rock Of Ages, on the UT radio station KUT. He played a wide spectrum of music that was readily available in the store. By 1978, Stephen Goodwin started making appearances as "The Old Codger" and other regular guests dropped by, like Paul Ray (of The Cobras and the KUT program Twine Time), disco DJ Casey Jones, writer Joe Nick Patoski, playwright Greg Barrios and Neil Ruttenberg. When McDaniel exited the show in 1979, Ruttenberg (taking on the moniker of "Rev. Neil X") took the reins at the height of the punk–new wave era. When he departed, he relayed the controls to store manager Jack Kanter in 1981. Both Ruttenberg and Kanter's editions of the show occasionally featured live performances in the studio from artists like Alex Chilton. Kanter's show was visited regularly by The Big Boys (featuring Randy "Biscuit" Turner). Kanter also served for a while as manager of the band Delta, while another staffer, Will Sharp, managed The Next.

== Location ==
504 W. 24th St. came to be known as Bluebonnet Plaza, and housed a head shop (Pipes Plus), a hair salon, and other businesses along with Inner Sanctum. Two popular restaurants flanked the building on either side: Octopus' Garden (later Mad Dog & Beans) and Les Amis Cafe, the latter of which was featured in the motion picture Slacker and the subject of a 2005 documentary, Viva Les Amis.

== Demise ==
Following the departures of both Kanter and Ruttenberg in the early 1980s, Bryson eventually sold the store. By 1997, property values throughout Austin had increased dramatically, and Inner Sanctum and the other tenants of Bluebonnet Plaza were forced to vacate when the owners decided to renovate the building.

== See also ==
- List of companies based in Austin, Texas
