= Red Exposure =

Studio album by Chrome
- Released: April 5, 1980
- Genre: Experimental rock
- Length: 34:37
- Label: Beggars Banquet
- Producer: Damon Edge

Chrome chronology
Read Only Memory (1979)	Red Exposure (1980)	Blood on the Moon (1981)

Professional ratings
Review scores
Source	Rating
AllMusic	4/5 stars

Red Exposure is the fourth studio album by American experimental rock band Chrome. It was released on April 5, 1980 by Beggars Banquet Records.

== Track listing ==
All music is composed by Chrome (Helios Creed, Damon Edge).

Side A
No.	Title	Lyrics	Lead vocals	Length
1.	"New Age"	Edge	Edge	2:56
2.	"Rm. 101"			1:56
3.	"Eyes on Mars"	Creed, Edge	Creed	3:32
4.	"Jonestown"	Creed, Edge	Edge	2:21
5.	"Animal"	Edge	Edge	2:49
6.	"Static Gravity"	Creed, Edge	Creed, Edge	3:08

Side B
No.	Title	Lyrics	Lead vocals	Length
1.	"Eyes in the Center"	Edge	Edge	4:03
2.	"Electric Chair"	Creed, Edge	Creed	4:07
3.	"Night of the Earth"	Creed, Edge	Creed, Edge	4:12
4.	"Isolation"	Edge	Edge	4:33

== Personnel ==
Chrome

- Helios Creed – vocals, guitar synthesizer, bowed guitar, synthesizer, drum machine, bass guitar, production
- Damon Edge – vocals, synthesizer, guitar synthesizer, tape operation, drum machine, production, mixing, mastering

Technical

- John L. Cyborg – engineering
- John Dent – mastering
- Oliver Dicicco – technical assistance
- Malti Kidia – cover artwork
- Tony Escott – cover artwork
- Ian Turner – cover photography
