= The Visitation (Chrome album) =

Studio album by Chrome
- Released: 1976
- Recorded: Alamar Studios in San Francisco, California
- Genre: Psychedelic rock, acid rock, Avant-garde, progressive rock
- Length: 37:21
- Label: Siren
- Producer: Damon Edge

Chrome chronology
The Visitation (1976)	Alien Soundtracks (1977)

Alternate cover

Professional ratings
Review scores
Source	Rating
AllMusic	3/5 stars

The Visitation is the debut studio album by American rock band Chrome. It was released in 1976 by Siren Records. In 2014, the album was re-released by Cleopatra Records with additional bonus tracks.

== Background ==
Unlike Chrome's later albums, The Visitation is in a psychedelic vein with progressive rock leanings. AllMusic described its style as "early Brian Eno meets Santana".

== Track listing ==
All tracks are written by Damon Edge, John Lambdin, Mike Low.

Side A
No.	Title	Length
1.	"How Many Years Too Soon"	5:10
2.	"Raider"	3:58
3.	"Return to Zanzibar"	3:52
4.	"Caroline"	3:42

Side B
No.	Title	Length
1.	"Riding You"	4:51
2.	"Kinky Lover"	3:32
3.	"Sun Control"	3:10
4.	"My Time to Live"	4:20
5.	"Memory Cords over the Bay"	4:46

== Personnel ==
Chrome

- Damon Edge – drums, synthesizer, backing vocals, production, sleeve design
- John Lambdin – guitar, bass guitar, mandolin, strings, synthesizer, electric violin, backing vocals
- Mike Low – lead vocals, bass guitar, guitar, synthesizer, backing vocals
- Gary Spain – bass guitar, keyboards, acoustic and electric violins

Technical

- Amy James – sleeve photography
