= Cinema Peligrosa =

Studio album by Glorium
- Released: 1994
- Recorded: April 1994 at Sweatbox Studios, Austin, Texas
- Genre: Post-punk
- Label: Undone Records
- Producer: Tim Kerr, Glorium

Glorium chronology
| Cinema Peligrosa (1994) | Past Life Recordings (1996) |

Cinema Peligrosa is the debut full-length studio album by the American post-punk band Glorium. It was released on Undone Records in 1994 on vinyl and compact disc. It was recorded at Sweatbox Studios in Austin, Texas, and produced by Tim Kerr.

== Track listing ==
1. "The Misinformed Vs. The Uniformed" – 4:21
2. "70 X 7" – 0:49
3. "The Final Dis" – 2:24
4. "Death Of The Insect Queen" – 6:29
5. "Mutant Lover Special" – 4:10
6. "Victim" – 5:01
7. "The Fossil" – 4:25
8. "Having The Devil On Your Side" – 4:08
9. "Under The Lid" – 3:56
10. "Blue Lights Beckon" – 1:54
11. "Possession Weapon" – 4:17
12. "A Place To Crash" – 6:07
13. "Cinema Plastique" – 5:33

== Personnel ==
- George Lara – bass
- Juan Miguel Ramos – drums
- Ernest Salaz – guitar, vocals
- Lino Max – guitar, vocals
- Paul Streckfus – vocals
- Tim Kerr – producer
- Paul Stautinger, Ben Lutin – engineer
- Walter Daniels, harp on "Having the Devil On Your Side"
