= Alien Soundtracks =

Studio album by Chrome
- Released: 1977
- Studio: Alamar (San Francisco, California)
- Genre: Avant-punk; psychedelic rock; industrial rock
- Length: 38:12
- Label: Siren
- Producer: Damon Edge

Chrome chronology
| The Visitation (1976) | Alien Soundtracks (1977) | Half Machine Lip Moves (1979) |

Alien Soundtracks is the second studio album by American rock band Chrome. It was released in 1977 by Siren Records.

== Background ==
Alien Soundtracks was Chrome's first record to feature Helios Creed, who would remain a longtime member of the band.

== Reception ==
Professional ratings
Review scores
| Source | Rating |
|---|---|
| AllMusic | 4/5 stars |
| Record Collector | 4/5 stars |

Head Heritage wrote: "'Alien Soundtracks' is where every aspect of Chrome is at its peak: at every speed and every facet as each barrage of electronic space debris, taped dialogue and collaged subterranean fears all get refracted through Damon Edge's hypersensitive and distorted mental lenses that project outwards into a crazy quilt of half-caught meaning that, however disjointed the content (which pitches and tosses at every turn), a unity emerges that remains invigorating and consistent at every turn."

Alternative Press named it one of the 15 best punk albums to have come out in 1977, writing: "If Iggy And The Stooges’ Raw Power was the sound of the Rolling Stones in hell, then Alien Soundtracks was the sound of the Stooges in hell, as a lo-fi sci-fi soundscape. The crude bashing and trash-compactor riffing had an acid-damaged edge, making this record both an avant-punk staple and early industrial-rock statement."

== Track listing ==
Side one
| No. | Title | Writer(s) | Length |
|---|---|---|---|
| 1. | "Chromosome Damage" | Helios Creed, Damon Edge | 3:50 |
| 2. | "The Monitors" | Creed, Edge | 2:23 |
| 3. | "All Data Lost" | Creed, Edge | 3:25 |
| 4. | "SS Cygni" | Creed, Edge | 3:33 |
| 5. | "Nova Feedback" | Edge, John Lambdin, Gary Spain | 5:53 |

Side two
| No. | Title | Writer(s) | Length |
|---|---|---|---|
| 1. | "Pygmies in Zee Park" | Creed, Edge | 6:01 |
| 2. | "Slip It to the Android" | Edge, Lambdin, Spain | 3:47 |
| 3. | "Pharoah Chromium" | Edge, Lambdin, Spain | 3:27 |
| 4. | "ST37" | Creed, Edge, Lambdin, Spain | 2:12 |
| 5. | "Magnetic Dwarf Reptile" | Creed, Edge, Lambdin, Spain | 3:41 |

== Personnel ==
Chrome

- Helios Creed – vocals, bass guitar, guitar
- Damon Edge – drums, Moog synthesizer, production, engineering, art direction
- John Lambdin – guitar, bass guitar, electric violin
- Gary Spain – bass guitar, acoustic and electric violins

Technical

- Michael Gore – mastering
- Amy James – sleeve photography
