= Half Machine Lip Moves =

Studio album by Chrome
- Released: March 15, 1979
- Studio: Alamar (San Francisco, California)
- Genre: Post-punk; industrial rock; sound collage
- Length: 35:55
- Label: Siren
- Producer: Damon Edge

Chrome chronology
Alien Soundtracks (1977)	Half Machine Lip Moves (1979)	Read Only Memory (1979)

Half Machine Lip Moves is the third studio album by American rock band Chrome. It was released on March 15, 1979, by Siren Records.

The album has been reissued several times on different labels: by Beggars Banquet Records in the United Kingdom in 1980, by Expanded Music in Italy in 1981, by Dossier Records in Germany in 1988, by Touch and Go Records in the United States in 1990, and by Cleopatra Records in the US in 2007 and 2012.

== Music ==
The creation of Half Machine Lip Moves was helmed by Chrome members Damon Edge and Helios Creed. AllMusic describes the album's basic elements as "aggressive but cryptic performance and production, jump cuts between and in songs, judicious use of sampling and production craziness, and an overall air of looming science fiction apocalypse and doom." It was described as post-punk by music writer Simon Reynolds. NME journalist Andy Gill wrote that the album departed from earlier Chrome albums by featuring excessive use of "disconcerting sound-collage washes and interjections", as well as frequent "vocal fragmentation", with "very few cases of the one track/one riff syndrome" to be found on the songs. It was cited as the "beginning of industrial rock".

== Reception ==
Professional ratings
Review scores
Source	Rating
AllMusic	4/5 stars
The Encyclopedia of Popular Music	3/5 stars
Record Collector	4/5 stars

British magazine The Wire included Half Machine Lip Moves on its list of "100 (130) Records That Set the World on Fire (While No One Was Listening)". In 2013, The New York Times wrote that "one of the things that makes the record so good is how intriguing the grooves and pockets and riffs are, how close the music theoretically seems to be getting to something more universally appealing—David Bowie's sound at that moment, for example."

== Track listing ==
Side A
No.	Title	Lyrics	Music	Length
1.	"T.V. as Eyes"	Helios Creed	Damon Edge, Gary Spain	2:19
2.	"Zombie Warfare (Can't Let You Down)"	Edge	Creed, Edge	5:47
3.	"March of the Chrome Police (A Cold Clamey Bombing)"	Edge	Edge	3:38
4.	"You've Been Duplicated"	Edge	Creed, Edge	2:38
5.	"Mondo Anthem"	Creed, Edge	Edge, Spain	3:33

Side B
No.	Title	Lyrics	Music	Length
1.	"Half Machine Lip Moves"	Creed, Edge	Creed, Edge	5:21
2.	"Abstract Nympho"	Creed, Edge	Creed, Edge	3:35
3.	"Turned Around"	Creed	Creed, Edge	2:01
4.	"Zero Time"	Creed	Creed, Edge	3:04
5.	"Creature Eternal"	Creed, Edge	Creed, Edge	1:53
6.	"Critical Mass"	Edge	Creed, Edge	2:00

== Personnel ==
Chrome

- Helios Creed – lead vocals, rhythm and lead guitar, bass guitar, bells, bowed guitar
- Damon Edge – lead vocals, keyboard guitar, organ, synthesizer, Moog synthesizer, percussion, drums, rhythm guitar ("Turned Around"), tape operation, production, engineering, art direction, sleeve photography

Additional personnel

- Gary Spain – bass guitar ("T.V. as Eyes", "Mondo Anthem")

Technical

- John L. Cyborg – electronics
- Bernie Grundman – mastering
- Amy James – sleeve photography, cover design
