= Scratch Acid =

American noise rock band

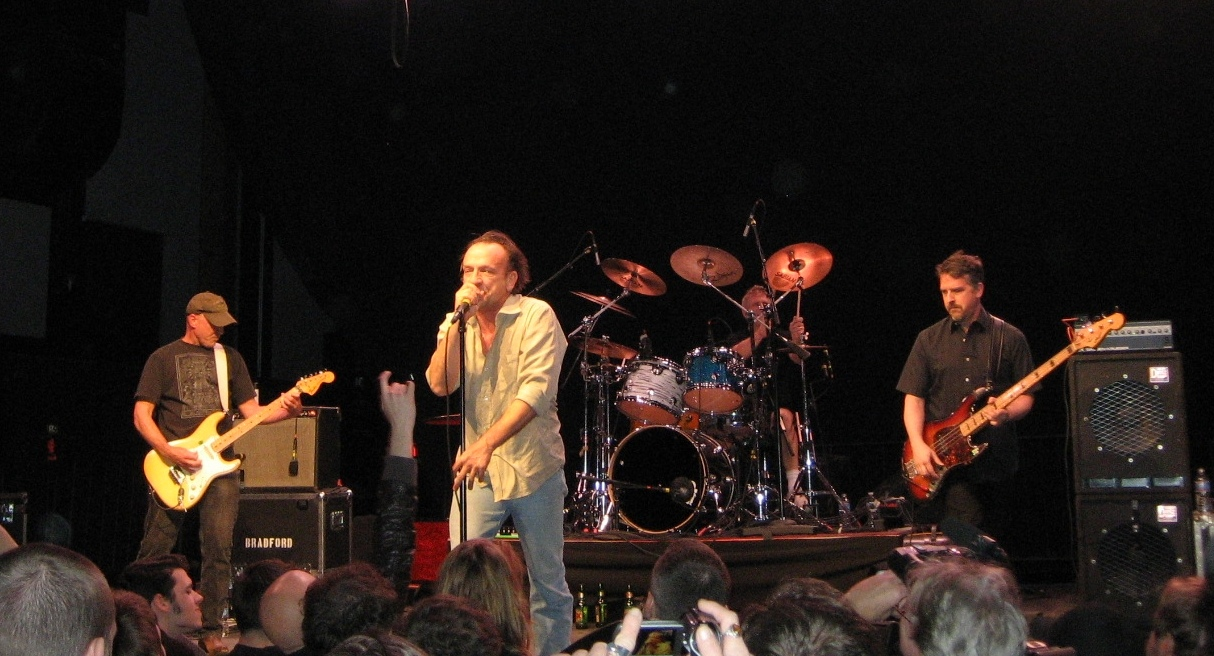
- Scratch Acid in 2011

Background information
- Origin: Austin, Texas, U.S.
- Genres: Noise rock; post-hardcore
- Years active: 1982–1987; 2006; 2011
- Labels: Rabid Cat; Touch and Go
- Past members: David Yow; David Wm. Sims; Rey Washam; Brett Bradford

Scratch Acid was an American noise rock band from Austin, Texas, formed in 1982. One of the pioneers of noise rock in the 1980s, the band is best remembered as a stepping stone for its frontman David Yow, and bass player David Wm. Sims, both later of the Jesus Lizard.

== History ==
Scratch Acid was launched in Austin, Texas, in 1982. When they first began, their lineup was Steve Anderson (vocals), David Wm. Sims (guitar), Brett Bradford (guitar), David Yow (bass), and Rey Washam (drums). Anderson was kicked out of the band before they ever recorded an album, prompting Yow to move to vocals and Sims to move to bass.

Scratch Acid's first EP was released in 1984, by Texas indie record label Rabid Cat and featured the song "Lay Screaming", a track which vocalist David Yow indicated was "inspired by Marquis de Sade, reading his shit."

The band returned to Rabid Cat for their debut album, Just Keep Eating, released in 1986. When queried about the significance of the title in a February 1987 interview, the band called the title "kinda silly" and "an inside joke", related to the fact that they all had lived together and done well to just keep surviving. Eschewing pop sensibilities but instead pushing boundaries with noise, the band listed Sonic Youth, Big Black, and Butthole Surfers as their stylistic peers.

The band's third and final release, an EP entitled Berserker, was released by Touch and Go Records. A posthumous compilation CD entitled The Greatest Gift was released by Touch and Go Records in 1991.

== Style and legacy ==
Scratch Acid has drawn comparisons to Australian band The Birthday Party, however, music journalist Andrew Earles stated that this is "only because that was really the only noticeable outside influence active at around the same time." According to him in the book Gimme Indie Rock, the band's lyrical themes explore topics including " societal gallows humor, depravity, and adolescent-to-adult sociopathic nastiness."

According to Stephen Thomas Erlewine of AllMusic, Scratch Acid "laid the groundwork for much of the distorted, grinding alternative/punk rockers of the '90s."

The band was named by music journalist Will Lerner as "the American equivalent of the Birthday Party." After developing a reputation as a crazy, noisy punk band, Scratch Acid disbanded in 1987. According to the liner notes of The Greatest Gift, the band members never received compensation from either Rabid Cat or Fundamental Records (who distributed their releases in Europe).

Writing in Flipside magazine, Gary Davis emphasized the band's rawness, energy, and earnestness in a live setting:

"...The band is unpretentious, fast, and forceful. They present no gimmicks, glamor, or elaborate stage show. After all, that's already been done so many times before. Scratch Acid simply walk on stage in their street clothes and begin to play. The quality of their music stands on its own."

== Later projects and reunions ==
Brett Bradford went on to form Colorado punk band Great Caesar's Ghost, who disbanded in 1993. He also formed Sangre De Toro and played with Areola 51. Washam went on to perform with many other bands, including the Big Boys, Ministry, Helios Creed, the Didjits, Lard, and Tad. In 1987, Sims and Washam joined Steve Albini in the band Rapeman, which disbanded just before Sims reunited with Yow in 1989 to form the Jesus Lizard.

All of the original members of the band appeared at Emo's nightclub in Austin on September 2, 2006, and at the Touch and Go 25th anniversary celebration in Chicago, Illinois on September 9, 2006. They played their third and final show of the brief reunion at Seattle's Showbox Theater on Saturday, September 16, playing 20 songs from their 28-song (recorded) oeuvre before leaving the stage.

The band reunited for their first UK show since 1987 at the second British All Tomorrow's Parties music festival March 9 through 11, 2012, curated by Neutral Milk Hotel's Jeff Mangum. David Wm. Sims also announced in his blog that the band would play dates in November and December in the US "and possibly in Europe". On August 31, David Yow released the complete list of tour dates on his Facebook page.

== Discography ==
EPs

- Scratch Acid (1984, Rabid Cat) – UK Indie no. 26
- Berserker (1987, Touch and Go Records) – UK Indie no. 7

LPs

- Just Keep Eating (1986, Rabid Cat)

Compilation

- The Greatest Gift (1991, Touch and Go Records)
