= Scratch Acid (EP) =

EP by Scratch Acid
- Released: 1984
- Recorded: July 1984 at Earth & Sky Studio, Austin, Texas
- Genre: Noise rock
- Length: 21:48
- Label: Rabid Cat
- Producer: Stacey Cloud

Scratch Acid chronology
Scratch Acid (1984)	Just Keep Eating (1986)

Professional ratings
Review scores
Source	Rating
Allmusic	3/5 stars

Scratch Acid is the self-titled debut by the Austin, Texas noise rock band Scratch Acid. It was only released on vinyl, but now can be found as the first 8 tracks on the compilation album The Greatest Gift.

Kurt Cobain consistently put the album in his "favorite albums" lists in his Journals.

Scratch Acid reached #26 in the UK Indie Chart.

== Reception ==
Spin wrote, "Guitars twist in Arabic-style '60s nyarls, and vortexes of violin weave through a post-Public Image nasal drone and play notes from a rusty symphony."

== Track listing ==
All tracks are written by Scratch Acid.

Side one
No.	Title	Lyrics	Music	Length
1.	"Cannibal"	David Yow	David Yow	2:24
2.	"Greatest Gift"	Steve Anderson	David Wm. Sims	2:11
3.	"Monsters"	David Wm. Sims	David Wm. Sims	1:19
4.	"Owner's Lament"	David Yow	Brett Bradford	4:39

Side two
No.	Title	Lyrics	Music	Length
1.	"She Said"	David Yow	Brett Bradford, David Wm. Sims	2:27
2.	"Mess"	David Yow	Brett Bradford, David Wm. Sims, Rey Washam	2:22
3.	"El Espectro"	Scratch Acid	Scratch Acid	3:39
4.	"Lay Screaming"	David Yow	David Wm. Sims, David Yow	2:47

== Personnel ==
Scratch Acid

- Brett Bradford – guitar
- David Wm. Sims – bass guitar
- Rey Washam – drums, string arrangement on "Owner's Lament"
- David Yow – vocals

Production and additional personnel

- Stacey Cloud – production
- Kerry Crafton – engineering
- Mark Todd – illustrations

== Charts ==
Chart (1984)	Peak position
UK Indie Chart	26
