= Inner Sanctum =

Inner Sanctum may refer to:

- Sanctum sanctorum, a Latin phrase meaning "Holy of Holies"

== Film and television ==
- Inner Sanctum (1948 film), an American horror mystery film
- Inner Sanctum (1991 film), an American film crime erotic thriller film
- Inner Sanctum (TV series), an American anthology television series

== Music and radio ==
- Inner Sanctum (band), an Indian death/thrash metal band
- Inner Sanctum, an American psychedelic rock band related to the Deep
- Inner Sanctum (album), a 2019 album by Pet Shop Boys
- The Inner Sanctum, a 2007 album by Saxon
- "Inner Sanctum", a song by Behemoth from their 2007 album The Apostasy
- "Inner Sanctum", a song by Pet Shop Boys from their 2016 album Super
- Inner Sanctum Records, a defunct American record shop
- Inner Sanctum Mystery, also known as Inner Sanctum, an American radio program

== See also ==
- Might and Magic Book One: The Secret of the Inner Sanctum, a 1986 video game
