= The Rapeman =

Japanese manga series

- Cover of the first manga volume

THE レイプマン (The Reipuman)
- Genre: Erotic; Black comedy; Superhero
- Manga
- Written by: Shintaro Miyawaki
- Published by: LEED Publishing
- Magazine: Lead Comic
- Original run: 1985 – 1992
- Volumes: 13
- Live-action film
- Directed by: Takao Nagaishi
- Written by: Jun Kojō
- Studio: Pink Pineapple
- Released: September 22, 1993
- Live-action film

The Rapeman 2
- Directed by: Takao Nagaishi
- Written by: Jun Kojō
- Studio: Pink Pineapple
- Released: March 11, 1994
- Live-action film

The Rapeman 3
- Directed by: Takao Nagaishi
- Written by: Jun Kojō
- Studio: Pink Pineapple
- Released: March 11, 1994
- Live-action film

The Rapeman 4
- Directed by: Takao Nagaishi
- Written by: Hitoshi Ogiichi
- Studio: Pink Pineapple
- Released: September 30, 1994
- Original video animation

The Rapeman Anime Version
- Directed by: Kinta Kunte
- Produced by: Kotaro Ran
- Written by: Kiyoshi Naito
- Studio: Pink Pineapple; TEC
- Released: October 28, 1994
- Episodes: 2
- Live-action film

The Rapeman 5
- Directed by: Takao Nagaishi
- Written by: Jun Kojō
- Studio: Pink Pineapple
- Released: March 31, 1995
- Live-action film

The Rapeman 6
- Directed by: Takao Nagaishi
- Written by: Jun Kojō
- Studio: Pink Pineapple
- Released: March 31, 1995
- Live-action film

The Rapeman 7
- Directed by: Takao Nagaishi
- Written by: Jun Kojō
- Studio: Pink Pineapple
- Released: December 1, 1995
- Live-action film

Ōedo Rapeman
- Directed by: Naoki Uesugi
- Written by: Tomo Suzuki, Mitsuo Sakai
- Studio: Pink Pineapple
- Released: July 26, 1996
- Live-action film

Ōedo Rapeman: Join Shokeijin
- Directed by: Naoki Uesugi
- Produced by: Matthew Winter
- Written by: Tomo Suzuki, Mitsuo Sakai
- Studio: Pink Pineapple
- Released: November 1, 1996

The Rapeman (THE レイプマン) was a Japanese black comedy manga series. It was credited as being created and written by Keiko Aizaki (愛崎 けい子, Aizaki Keiko), and illustrated by Shintaro Miyawaki (みやわき 心太郎, Miyawaki Shintarō), and ran from 1985 to 1992. The controversial premise features a high school teacher who has a secret life as a rapist for hire. The series was discontinued after 13 volumes. Nine Rapeman live action feature films were released between 1993 and 1996 by Pink Pineapple.

== Plot ==
Poster for the second film of the live-action film series

The main character, Keisuke Iwasaki (岩崎 圭介 Iwasaki Keisuke), is a handsome and very muscular high school teacher by day and dispenses a surreal and perverted brand of "justice" at night as the Rapeman under the business "Rapeman Services", which is co-run with his uncle, a former surgeon with ties to the Yakuza. The business' motto is: "Righting wrongs through penetration." Clients call on the Rapeman to handle cases such as the revenge of a jilted lover, forming parental bonds through a traumatic crisis, making disruptive co-workers more docile and other things of that nature.

When engaged in his night trade, the Rapeman wears a black leather ski mask shaped like the head of a penis, but no trousers or underwear. In the middle of a rape, if the woman/girl becomes unresponsive or expresses enjoyment, he uses special techniques such as "M69 Screwdriver" or "Infinite Loop" to apply more pain to the victim. Despite regretting some of the contracts he fulfills, he always completes the task.

== Film adaptations ==
Pink Pineapple produced nine Rapeman live action feature films (including six sequels and two spin-off films), released between 1993 and 1996. The first seven were directed by Takao Nagaishi and the final two were directed by Naoki Uesugi. In their Japanese Cinema Encyclopedia: The Sex Films, the Weissers write that series director, Takao Nagaishi, took "a patently offensive premise and twisted it into a wickedly funny black-comedy for adults ... His camerawork is slick, and the music is hypnotic. Plus he has co-authored clever scripts with surprisingly intricate plotlines. And, most importantly, Nagaishi has taken the time to develop a group of characters who are actually very likable."

A two-episode OVA was released in 1994, chronicling his exploits in the first volume of the manga. The Rapeman's garb is different in the anime version, as he is dressed in quasi-ninja gear.

== Impact ==
The comic was mentioned by name in articles published in foreign publications in an attempt to delve into Japan's sex culture in the wake of the 2003 Waseda University Super Free "rape club" scandal. A band called Rapeman credits the comic for the name the band chose. Frontman Steve Albini and drummer Rey Washam admitted their obsession with the character and that obsession carrying over to naming the band. Albini admitted to coming across the comic through a friend.

On October 4, 1999, almost 3 years after the final release in the franchise, a fictional 14th volume of the series was featured in episode 3 "...Or Just Look Like One" of the crime drama TV series Law and Order: SVU. It is used by the prosecutor (who calls upon detective Monique Jeffries as a witness) as a piece of evidence against a young man accused of rape, whose father is also being charged as an accessory for bringing the comic into the house. The Rapeman is erroneously described as a high school student that turns into the alter-ego at night to take revenge on the girls at school that wronged him, rather than the adult "gun for hire" that Keisuke is.

Rapeman-artist Shintaro Miyawaki appears as a party guest in Kim Newman's novel Anno Dracula 1999 Daikaiju (2019).

== See also ==
- Hanzo the Razor – A 1970s exploitation movie set in Feudal Japan in which the protagonist uses rape to extract information.
