= Budd (EP) =

EP by Rapeman
- Released: May 23, 1988
- Genre: Post-hardcore, noise rock
- Length: 14:44
- Label: (United States) Touch & Go Records (United Kingdom) Blast First (Australia) Au Go Go Records (Netherlands) Torso Records
- Producer: Steve Albini

Rapeman chronology
Budd (1988)	Two Nuns and a Pack Mule (1988)

Professional ratings
Review scores
Source	Rating
AllMusic	2/5 stars
OndaRock	8.5/10
Rolling Stone	3/5 stars

Budd is the first release by the Chicago noise rock band Rapeman. The first three songs on the EP were recorded live. The title is a reference to R. Budd Dwyer, a politician who committed suicide during a televised press conference. The lyrics of the title track contain references to phrases used during the incident.

The EP has been re-released as bonus tracks at the end of Two Nuns and a Pack Mule, the band's only LP.

Studio versions of the first three tracks were originally planned to be used, but the band later decided in favour of live versions. The demo tracks are currently available in trading circles.

Pitchfork ranked the record 6th on their list of "Steve Albini's 10 Best Records", writing that what made the title track "all the more harrowing, not to mention innovative, is the vast amount of empty spaces and granular surfaces [...] [worked] into the near-eight-minute song. It’s a brooding, abstract dynamic that would set the tone for much of ‘90s post-rock, from Slint to June of 44."

== Track listing ==
1. "Budd" - 7:29
2. "Superpussy" - 2:12
3. "Log Bass" - 2:23
4. "Dutch Courage" - 2:40

== Personnel ==
- Rey Washam – drums
- David Wm. Sims – bass
- Steve Albini – guitar, vocals
- Timothy R. Powell – recording engineer (1, 2, 3)
- Iain Burgess – recording engineer (4)
