= The Greatest Gift (disambiguation) =

The Greatest Gift is a 1943 short story written by Philip Van Doren Stern, which became the basis for the film It's a Wonderful Life. The Greatest Gift may also refer to:

== Film and television ==
- The Greatest Gift (TV series), an American soap opera broadcast from 1954 to 1955
- The Greatest Gift (film), a 1974 American television drama film starring Glenn Ford
- The Greatest Gift (2018), film by Juan Manuel Cotelo
- "The Greatest Gift", the 13th episode of the third season of Warehouse 13

== Music ==
=== Albums ===
- The Greatest Gift (Scratch Acid album), a 1991 album by Scratch Acid
- The Greatest Gift, a 1999 album by Liberty 37
- The Greatest Gift: An Album Of Christmas Classics, a 2004 album by Charlie Landsborough
- The Greatest Gift: Songs of the Season, a 2009 album by Alexis Cole
- The Greatest Gift (mixtape), a 2017 mixtape by Sufjan Stevens

=== Songs ===
- "The Greatest Gift", a 1966 song by Cassietta George
- "The Greatest Gift", a 1975 song by Henry Mancini
- "The Greatest Gift", a 1976 song by Narvel Felts
- "The Greatest Gift", a 1993 song by Robert Plant from his album Fate of Nations
- "Greatest Gift", a 1994 song by Tina Arena
