= Berserker (EP) =

EP by Scratch Acid
- Released: 1986
- Recorded: September 1986 at Studio West, Austin, Texas
- Genre: Noise rock
- Length: 16:41
- Label: Touch and Go
- Producer: Kerry Crafton, Scratch Acid

Scratch Acid chronology
Just Keep Eating (1986)	Berserker (1986)	The Greatest Gift (1991)

Professional ratings
Review scores
Source	Rating
Allmusic	4.5/5 stars

Berserker is an EP, the final release by the Austin, Texas, noise rock band Scratch Acid. The songs can also be found as tracks 22–27 on the compilation album The Greatest Gift.

Berserker reached #7 in the UK Indie Chart.

== Track listing ==
All tracks are written by Scratch Acid.

Side one
No.	Title	Lyrics	Music	Length
1.	"Mary Had a Little Drug Problem"	David Yow	Brett Bradford, David Wm. Sims, Rey Washam	2:16
2.	"For Crying Out Loud"	Simon Bollerjack	David Wm. Sims	3:06
3.	"Moron's Moron"	David Yow	David Wm. Sims	3:13

Side two
No.	Title	Lyrics	Music	Length
1.	"Skin Drips"	David Yow	David Wm. Sims, Rey Washam, David Yow	2:42
2.	"This Is Bliss"	David Yow	Rey Washam	2:16
3.	"Flying Houses"	David Yow	Brett Bradford, David Wm. Sims, Rey Washam	3:08

== Personnel ==
Scratch Acid

- Brett Bradford – guitar
- David Wm. Sims – bass guitar
- Rey Washam – drums
- David Yow – vocals

Production and additional personnel

- Kerry Crafton – production, engineering
- Scratch Acid – production
- Mark Todd – illustrations

== Chart positions ==
Charts (1986)	Peak position
UK Indie Chart	7
