= Just Keep Eating =

Studio album by Scratch Acid
- Released: 1986
- Recorded: January 1986 at Cedar Creek Studios, Austin, Texas
- Genre: Noise rock
- Length: 33:26
- Label: Rabid Cat
- Producer: Fred Remmert

Scratch Acid chronology
Scratch Acid (1984)	Just Keep Eating (1986)	Berserker (1986)

Professional ratings
Review scores
Source	Rating
Allmusic	3/5 stars

Just Keep Eating is the only full-length album by the Austin, Texas noise rock band Scratch Acid. Although it was only released on vinyl, it can be found as tracks 9–21 on the compilation album The Greatest Gift.

== Accolades ==
Publication	Country	Accolade	Year	Rank
Spex	Germany	Albums of the Year	1986	34

== Track listing ==
Side one
No.	Title	Lyrics	Music	Length
1.	"Crazy Dan"	David Yow	Brett Bradford	4:13
2.	"Eyeball"	Jim Gross, David Yow	Brett Bradford, David Wm. Sims	2:06
3.	"Big Bone Lick"	David Yow	Brett Bradford, David Wm. Sims, David Yow	3:48
4.	"Unlike a Baptist"	David Yow	Simon Bollerjack	2:28
5.	"Damned for All Time"	Tim Rice	Andrew Lloyd Webber	2:01
6.	"Ain't That Love"	David Yow	Brett Bradford, David Wm. Sims	2:17
7.	"[untitled]"			0:31

Side two
No.	Title	Lyrics	Music	Length
1.	"Holes"	Brett Bradford	David Yow	2:00
2.	"Albino Slug"		Brett Bradford	3:26
3.	"Spit a Kiss"	David Yow	Brett Bradford, David Wm. Sims	2:02
4.	"Amicus"	David Yow	David Wm. Sims	3:15
5.	"Cheese Plug"	David Yow	Brett Bradford	2:45
6.	"[untitled]"			2:20

== Personnel ==
Scratch Acid

- Brett Bradford – guitar, vocals on "Holes"
- David Wm. Sims – bass guitar, piano, guitar on "Holes"
- Rey Washam – drums, piano on "Ain't That Love", "Holes" and "Cheese Plug"
- David Yow – vocals, bass guitar on "Holes"

Production and additional personnel

- Tay Blations – harmonica on "Unlike a Baptist"
- George Horn – mastering
- Anthony Johnson – additional guitar on "Ain't That Love?"
- Fred Remmert – engineering
