= Blood on the Moon (album) =

Studio album by Chrome
- Released: May 31, 1981
- Recorded: Mobius Music in San Francisco, California, United States
- Genre: Experimental rock
- Length: 34:14
- Label: Don't Fall Off the Mountain
- Producer: Helios Creed; Damon Edge

Chrome chronology
Red Exposure (1980)	Blood on the Moon (1981)	3rd from the Sun (1982)

Professional ratings
Review scores
Source	Rating
AllMusic	4/5 stars

Blood on the Moon is the fifth studio album by American experimental rock band Chrome. It was released on May 31, 1981 by Don't Fall Off the Mountain.

== Reception ==
Ned Raggett of AllMusic opined that, with Blood on the Moon, "Chrome veered towards creating more 'regular' rock music, if only conceptually".

== Track listing ==
All tracks are written by Helios Creed and Damon Edge.

Side A
No.	Title	Length
1.	"The Need"	3:02
2.	"Innervacume"	2:55
3.	"Perfumed Metal"	4:39
4.	"Planet Strike"	2:25
5.	"The Strangers"	3:35

Side B
No.	Title	Length
1.	"Insect Human"	4:55
2.	"Out of Reach"	3:36
3.	"Brain Scan"	3:59
4.	"Blood on the Moon"	5:08

== Personnel ==
Chrome

- Helios Creed – vocals, guitar, production, sleeve graphics
- Damon Edge – vocals, Moog synthesizer, production, sleeve graphics
- Hilary Stench – bass guitar
- John Stench – drums

Technical

- Oliver (Oliver Dicicco) – recording
