= Two Nuns and a Pack Mule =

1988 studio album by Rapeman

Studio album by Rapeman
- Released: August 23, 1988
- Genres: Post-hardcore; noise rock
- Length: 29:11; 43:55 (with Budd EP)
- Label: Touch and Go
- Producers: Steve Albini, Fluss

Rapeman chronology
Budd (1988)	Two Nuns and a Pack Mule (1988)

Two Nuns and a Pack Mule is the only studio album by the Chicago noise rock band Rapeman, released by Touch and Go Records on August 23, 1988. The CD issue contains the Budd extended play.

== Reception ==
Professional ratings
Review scores
Source	Rating
AllMusic	4.5/5 stars
Alternative Rock	7/10
The Great Rock Discography	7/10
OndaRock	8/10
Rolling Stone	4/5 stars

The indie music press largely applauded the album as the much awaited studio follow-up to Steve Albini's work with his previous band Big Black. Trouser Press compared it favorably to their Budd EP, writing that the album "fits Albini's distinctive meltdown guitar and shriek vocals into rough song forms [...] Rapeman spits out sparks with the conviction of Albini's acerbic intelligence."

In retrospective reviews, Jason Ankeny of AllMusic wrote that the album "varies in its attack in ways Albini's old trio Big Black never did; the demented rhythms constantly threaten to veer out of control, and Albini's guitar screeches like something rabid and bloodthirsty", sarcastically writing that lyrically, "the group displays the same warmth and compassion so evident in their choice of a name [...] songs tackle sex ("Trouser Minnow"), ethnicity ("Hated Chinee"), and classic rock ("Radar Love Lizard")." FACT Magazine ranked it the 28th best album of the 1980s, calling the "oft-overlooked" album "one of Albini’s greatest moments on the other side of the production desk." Dominick Fernow wrote that the album "was one of the first rock records I ever heard that made me question owning it [...] quite possibly the last dangerous rock album made?"

== Track listing ==
All songs written by Rapeman, except "Just Got Paid", written by Billy Gibbons and Bill Ham.

Side Yo

1. "Steak and Black Onions" – 2:47
2. "Monobrow" – 3:45
3. "Up Beat" – 2:15
4. "Coition Ignition Mission" – 2:23
5. "Kim Gordon's Panties" – 4:17

Side Mo

1. "Hated Chinee" – 2:01
2. "Marmoset" – 1:50
3. "Radar Love Lizard" – 2:12
4. "Just Got Paid" – 3:35 (ZZ Top cover)
5. "Trouser Minnow" – 4:06

Bonus tracks on CD edition (Budd EP)

11. "Budd" – 7:29
12. "Superpussy" – 2:12
13. "Log Bass" – 2:23
14. "Dutch Courage" – 2:40

The tracks "Marmoset" and "Radar Love Lizard" were mistakenly listed in reverse order on the vinyl edition's track listing. Their titles were mistakenly swapped on the CD version.

The inner sleeve contained explanations of the lyrical content for the tracks:

1. "We Don't Hate Vegetarians, We Just Think They Are Funny"
2. "Singular Eyebrow as a Fashion Statement"
3. "Puny But Angry"
4. "A Professed Goal of Space Program; Conception and Birth in Space"
5. "Blatant Coachmen Rip off"
6. "Lotten Flucking Ruck"
7. "Golden Earring Tribute/Reptile Tendencies"
8. "Lincoln Park Zoo Nocturnal Mammal Building/Failed Hummer"
9. "Bonus Edgar Blossom Muchas Gracias"
10. "Men Suck"

== Personnel ==
Rapeman

- Steve Albini – guitar, vocals
- David Wm. Sims – bass guitar, co-vocals on "Just Got Paid"
- Rey Washam – drums

Production

- Steve Albini – production
- Fluss – production
- Kerry Crafton – engineering
