= Fat Elvis =

The term Fat Elvis originally referred to the later years of Elvis Presley. It may also refer to:

- A character in the British soap opera EastEnders
- Lance Berkman, American baseball player nicknamed "Fat Elvis"
- The Fat Elvis, a 1993 album by Big Boys
- John Lennon's description of himself in 1965.
