= Firebomb =

Firebomb may refer to:

- Firebombing
- Incendiary device
- Molotov cocktail
- A season 2 episode of the television show Alias
- "Firebomb", a song by Chrome from their 1982 album 3rd from the Sun
- "Fire Bomb", a song by Rihanna from her 2009 album Rated R
