= Live at Raul's Club =

Live album by The Dicks/The Big Boys
- Released: 1980
- Genre: Skate punk
- Length: 38:52
- Label: Rat Race

The Dicks chronology
Hate the Police 7" (1980)	Live at Raul's Club (1980)	Kill from the Heart (1983)

Big Boys chronology
Frat Cars 7" (1980)	Live at Raul's Club (1980)	Where's My Towel/Industry Standard (1981)

Recorded Live at Raul's Club is an album by the Big Boys and The Dicks. In 1992, Selfless Records issued a double 7" called Live at Raul's Club featuring 6 songs from this record (three from each group) along with 2 previously unreleased live songs.

== Track listing ==
=== The Big Boys "Side B" ===
No.	Title	Length
1.	"Detectives"	2:58
2.	"Out of Focus"	2:15
3.	"Psycho"	3:50
4.	"Red/Green"	2:25
5.	"In the City"	3:00
6.	"Nightbeat"	1:38
7.	"After 12:00"	3:12
Total length:		19:18

=== The Dicks "Side D" ===
No.	Title	Length
1.	"Fake Bands"	1:30
2.	"Dicks Hate the Police"	2:00
3.	"Dead In a Motel Room"	1:45
4.	"Wheelchair Epidemic"	2:14
5.	"Babysit"	1:10
6.	"Shit On Me"	2:02
7.	"Lifetime Problems"	1:44
8.	"Suicide Note"	2:15
9.	"Shit Fool"	2:52
10.	"Love Song"	2:02
Total length:		19:34

== Reissue track listing ==
=== The Big Boys ===
1. TV
2. Nightbeat
3. After 12:00
4. Psycho

=== The Dicks ===
1. Fake Bands
2. Shit Fool
3. Kill From the Heart
4. Shit On Me
