= Fantasmas (Glorium album) =

Compilation album by Glorium
- Released: 2004
- Recorded: 1992–1997
- Genre: Post-punk
- Label: Golden Hour Records

Glorium chronology
Close Your Eyes (1998)	Fantasmas (2004)

Fantasmas is a collection of previously released and unreleased songs by Glorium. 200 copies were released on Golden Hour Records in 2004 on compact disc.

== Background ==
In 1996, Glorium recorded material with producer John Croslin in his studio with the hopes of releasing a full-length album. After no interest from any labels, the band self-released a 7-inch single of Black Market Hearts b/w Walkie-Talkie on Golden Hour Records. The rest of the Croslin material was not used until Fantasmas.

In 2005 the band began to discuss releasing a compilation of these and other previously released vinyl recordings, as well as outtakes from other recording sessions throughout their active career.

Paul Streckfus designed the CD artwork.

== Track listing ==
1. "The Double"+ – 3:20
2. "Black Market Hearts"*+ – 4:06
3. "The Door is Ajar"++ – 1:18
4. "Vaccine, Mercury Rises"+ – 4:02
5. "Psyklops"+ – 4:33
6. "Brownie Hawkeye"+ – 3:11
7. "Walkie-Talkie"+ – 5:52
8. "Mother Machine"+++ – 4:57
9. "My Wandering Mountain"++++ – 5:36
10. "Future News from the Front Line"++++ – 3:39
11. "Ghost-Writer"++++ – 4:10
12. "Rip-Off"++++ – 2:38
13. "Here We Come To Your City"& – 3:43
14. Electricidad (
15. My Demolition
16. Fearless
17. Iced The Swelling
18. Divebomb

== Personnel ==
- George Lara – bass
- Juan Miguel Ramos – drums
- Ernest Salaz – guitar, vocals
- Lino Max – guitar, vocals
- Paul Streckfus – vocals
- * Nikki Holiday – synthesizer
- + John Croslin – producer
- ++ Adam Wiltzie – engineer
- +++ Mark Phillips – engineer
- ++++ Kurtis D. Machler – engineer
- & Grant Barger – producer, engineer
- Greg Goodman, mastering engineer
