= The Greatest Gift (Scratch Acid album) =

Compilation album by Scratch Acid
- Released: October 25, 1991
- Recorded: December 1982–October 1986
- Genre: Noise rock
- Length: 75:09
- Label: Touch and Go
- Producers: Kerry Crafton, Fred Remmert, Timothy Bradford

Scratch Acid chronology
Berserker (1986)	The Greatest Gift (1991)

Professional ratings
Review scores
Source	Rating
Allmusic	4.5/5 stars

The Greatest Gift is a posthumously released compilation album by the American noise rock band Scratch Acid. It contains all of the material they released throughout their career, in chronological order of release.

== Track listing ==
- Tracks 1–8: Scratch Acid
- Tracks 9–21: Just Keep Eating
- Tracks 22–27: Berserker
1. "Cannibal" – 2:24
2. "Greatest Gift" – 2:11
3. "Monsters" – 1:19
4. "Owner's Lament" – 4:39
5. "She Said" – 2:27
6. "Mess" – 2:22
7. "El Espectro" – 3:39
8. "Lay Screaming" – 2:47
9. "Crazy Dan" – 4:13
10. "Eyeball" – 2:06
11. "Big Bone Lick" – 3:48
12. "Unlike a Baptist" – 2:31
13. "Damned for All Time" – 2:05
14. "Ain't That Love" – 2:23
15. (untitled) – 0:29
16. "Holes" – 2:00
17. "Albino Slug" – 3:26
18. "Spit a Kiss" – 2:02
19. "Amicus" – 3:15
20. "Cheese Plug" – 2:45
21. (untitled) – 2:20
22. "Mary Had a Little Drug Problem" – 2:16
23. "For Crying out Loud" – 3:06
24. "Moron's Moron" – 3:13
25. "Skin Drips" – 2:42
26. "This Is Bliss" – 2:16
27. "Flying Houses" – 3:08
28. "The Scale Song" – 3:04

== Personnel ==
- Brett Bradford – guitar
- David Wm. Sims – bass guitar
- Rey Washam – drums
- David Yow – vocals
