= Kiss to the Brain =

Studio album by Helios Creed
- Released: 1992
- Genre: Space rock, industrial rock
- Length: 41:53
- Label: Amphetamine Reptile
- Producer: Helios Creed, Matt Kelley

Helios Creed chronology
Lactating Purple (1991)	Kiss to the Brain (1992)	Your Choice Live Series (1994)

Kiss to the Brain is an album by the rock band Helios Creed. It was released through Amphetamine Reptile Records. Songs from the supporting tour were released on Your Choice Live Series.

== Critical reception ==
Professional ratings
Review scores
Source	Rating
AllMusic	4.5/5 stars

Trouser Press determined that "the guitar pops up as more than just a guidepost, and the contrast makes the moments of otherworldly radio static, menacing vocoder distortions and sci-fi freakouts all the more effective."

AllMusic wrote: "This is still not anywhere near mainstream hard rock—there's plenty of bizarre lyrics and spacy sound effects, even on the hard rock songs—but it does display that Helios Creed has the ability to create more than unstructured sonic explorations."

== Track listing ==
All tracks are written by Helios Creed.

No.	Title	Length
1.	"XL-35"	6:06
2.	"Mountain Mystery"	2:56
3.	"Malavia Millenium"	3:59
4.	"Anubis Warpus"	5:28
5.	"The Federation"	1:56
6.	"Kiss to the Brain"	7:29
7.	"Throw Away the Rind"	2:19
8.	"Nemesis"	3:29
9.	"Legs"	2:59
10.	"Acid Rain"	5:12

== Personnel ==
Musicians

- Helios Creed – vocals, guitar, sampler, production
- Paul Kirk – bass guitar
- Paul Della Pelle – drums
- Z Sylver – synthesizer, sampler, vocals

Production and additional personnel

- Krystl Chamber – additional vocals
- Matt Kelley – production, engineering
