= Fabienne Shine =

French musician (born 1944)

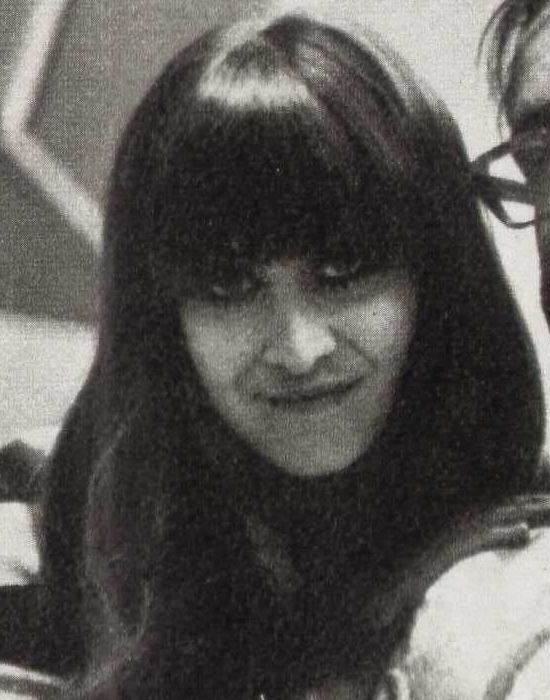
- Fabienne Shine in 1967

Background information
- Born: Fabienne Essaïagh; 1944 (age 81–82); French protectorate of Tunisia
- Origin: Paris, France
- Genres: Rock; Heavy metal
- Occupations: Musician; composer
- Instruments: Guitar; vocals
- Years active: 1975–present
- Labels: CBS; Columbia International

Fabienne Shine (born Fabienne Essaïagh in 1944 in Tunisia) is a French musician. She was raised in Paris.

In the late 1960s, she began working as a film actress in both Italy and France, under the name Fabienne Fabre. She is best-known today for her uncredited appearance as "The Woman of the Trees" (a.k.a. "Twiggy") in Roger Vadim's Barbarella.

Fabre started writing songs and composing her own music at an early age. She travelled the world with her guitar and met the band Led Zeppelin, who liked her songs. Robert Plant and Jimmy Page often jammed with her and finally suggested that she should create a band.

After touring the U.S. with Led Zeppelin, Fabre went back to Europe and met a young guitarist, Eric Lévi, at a concert in Paris. They decided to start a band in 1975, Shakin' Street (first named either Speedball or Spitball, depending on which version of the story is being told). She changed her last name to "Shine" (pronounced "sheen") about this time. They were exposed to the press and signed a contract with CBS/Columbia Records. The band gathered musicians like Louis Bertignac (lead guitar) and Corinne Marienneau (bass guitar), who would later join the French rock band, Téléphone.

In 1978 Shakin' Street released their first album, Vampire Rock. The album was never released in the United States, but the band moved to California soon afterwards. In 1979 they recorded their eponymous second album, in New York and San Francisco with Columbia record producer Sandy Pearlman, known for creating the band Blue Öyster Cult. New York guitarist Ross Friedman, aka Ross the Boss, formerly of The Dictators, joined Shakin' Street as lead guitarist.

In 1980, she met Damon Edge of post-punk/industrial band Chrome; they married that same year. She went on to collaborate with Edge on several Chrome albums; her vocals appear on the album 3rd from the Sun. In 1983, Edge moved to Paris to be with her, but the couple separated several years later. Edge died in 1995.

Shine released her autobiography in 2014, Sexe, Drogues & Rock'n'roll, co-written with French rock critic Jean-Eric Perrin.

== Discography ==
=== with Shakin' Street ===
- Vampire Rock (1978)
- Shakin' Street (1980)
- 21st Century Love Channel (2009)
- Psychic (2014)

=== Solo ===
- No Mad Nomad (1997)
- Fabienne Shine and the Planets (credited to Fabienne Shine and the Planets) (2007)
- Don't Tell Me How to Shake It (2019)

== Selected filmography ==
Year	Title	Role	Director
1967	Fantabulous Inc.	Alice	Sergio Spina
1967	The Subversives	Giovanna	Paolo and Vittorio Taviani
1967	The Visionaries	Valeria	Maurizio Ponzi
1968	Barbarella	The Female Tree	Roger Vadim
1969	Scusi, facciamo l'amore?	Puccio Picco	Vittorio Caprioli
1970	Lettera aperta a un giornale della sera	The Student	Francesco Maselli
