= Close Your Eyes (Glorium album) =

Studio album by Glorium
- Released: 1998
- Recorded: Summer 1997, Austin, Texas
- Genre: Post-punk
- Label: Golden Hour Records
- Producer: Glorium, Grant Barger

Glorium chronology
Eclipse (1997)	Close Your Eyes (1998)	Fantasmas (2005)

Close Your Eyes is the third and final full-length studio album by Glorium. It was recorded in singer's Paul Streckfus's attic in the summer of 1997. Only 40 CDs were ever made. Grant Barger (Palace Music, The For Carnation) engineered.

== Track listing ==
1. "Heavy FM Damage" – 4:07
2. "Us + The Bad Past" – 3:34
3. "Mnemonic Me" – 3:50
4. "Doomsday Kiss" – 4:20
5. "The Spiral Moat"+ – 3:04
6. "Moonbeam King" – 3:50
7. "White Noise, Black Road" – 1:24
8. "Having The Devil On Your Side" – 4:08
9. "Ape-men At Sea" – 4:53
10. "5+20" – 2:52
11. "Skeleton Keyring" – 1:15
12. "Hold Still" – 6:00

== Personnel ==
- George Lara – bass
- Juan Miguel Ramos – drums
- Ernest Salaz – guitar, vocals
- Lino Max – guitar, vocals
- Paul Streckfus – vocals
- + Malcom Hamilton – synthesizers
- Glorium, Grant Barger – producer
