= Past Life Recordings =

Compilation album by Glorium
- Released: 1997
- Recorded: Jan 1992 at Robbie Dennis’ studio in San Antonio Tx and at Lone Star Studios, Austin, Texas
- Genre: Post-punk
- Label: Existential Vacuum
- Producer: Glorium

Glorium chronology
Cinema Peligrosa (1994)	Past Life Recordings (1997)	Eclipse (1997)

Past Life Recordings is a limited-edition compilation LP by Glorium and was released on Existential Vacuum Records in 1997. It contains material from the band's first two studio sessions from January 1992 and November 1992, including their first 2 singles. 300 copies were pressed, all silk-screened on white vinyl.

== Track listing ==
1. "Chemical Angel"+ – 2:53
2. "Groundfloor"+ – 4:18
3. "Madonna"+ – 4:29
4. "Dive-Bomb"+ – 4:35
5. "Believe in Nothing"+ – 3:18
6. "Collision"+ – 3:57
7. "Hole in Your Art" – 4:15
8. "Ashes"++ – 3:28
9. "Poisons"++ – 3:15
10. "Sound Asleep"++ 2–49
11. "Iced The Swelling"++ – 3:34
12. "Fearless"++ – 3:04

== Personnel ==
- George Lara – bass
- Juan Miguel Ramos – drums
- Ernest Salaz – guitar, vocals
- Lino Max – guitar, vocals
- Paul Streckfus – vocals
- Robbie Dennis+ – engineer
- Lisa Rickenberg++ – engineer at Lonestar Studios
