= Techromancy =

Studio album by Chrome
- Released: April 21, 2017
- Genre: Post-punk, industrial rock
- Label: Cleopatra Records

Chrome chronology
Feel It Like a Scientist (2014)	Techromancy (2017)

Techromancy is the twentieth studio album by Chrome, which was follow up album to Feel It Like a Scientist . The album was released on Cleopatra Records in April 2017.

== Track listing ==
No.	Title	Length
1.	"Administer the Treatment"	5:27
2.	"Black Diamond"	2:40
3.	"Sex Pocket Meister"	2:12
4.	"Death Is a Pusher"	2:07
5.	"Tears in Space"	3:14
6.	"Time Slider"	3:49
7.	"Pyramid of Planets"	3:14
8.	"The Mandela Effect Pedal"	3:49
9.	"Execution"	1:02
10.	"The Other Side"	2:25
11.	"Devils Flight"	3:14
12.	"Just for You"	3:08
Total length:		36:22

== Personnel ==
- Chrome – Composer
- Helios Creed – Composer, engineer, mixing, producer
- Keith Thompson – Engineer, mixing
- Andrew James – Assistant engineer, synthesizer
- Mort Subite – Assistant engineer
- Monet Clark – Photography
- Fendi Nugroho – Design, layout
- Lux Vibratus – Sampling
- Aleph Omega – Drums, percussion
