= 3rd from the Sun =

Studio album by Chrome
- Released: May 26, 1982
- Recorded: Hyde Street Studios, San Francisco, California, United States
- Genre: Gothic rock; space rock
- Length: 35:12
- Label: Don't Fall Off the Mountain
- Producer: Helios Creed; Damon Edge

Chrome chronology
Blood on the Moon (1981)	3rd from the Sun (1982)	Chrome Box (1982)

Singles from 3rd from the Sun
- 1. "Firebomb"/"Shadows of a Thousand Years" Released: 1982

3rd from the Sun is the sixth studio album by the experimental rock band Chrome. It was released May 26, 1982 by Don't Fall Off the Mountain.

== Musical style ==
The Quietus described the album's musical style as "gothic space rock".

== Reception ==
Professional ratings
Review scores
Source	Rating
AllMusic	4.5/5 stars

AllMusic gave 3rd from the Sun the highest rating of any Chrome album, while CMJ New Music Monthly called the album "magnificent".

== Track listing ==
All tracks are written by Helios Creed and Damon Edge.

Side A
No.	Title	Length
1.	"Firebomb"	3:43
2.	"Future Ghosts"	5:19
3.	"Armageddon"	8:35

Side B
No.	Title	Length
1.	"Heart Beat"	5:05
2.	"Off the Line"	4:32
3.	"3rd from the Sun"	4:41
4.	"Shadows of a Thousand Years"	3:37

== Personnel ==
Chrome

- Helios Creed – vocals, guitar, production
- Damon Edge – vocals, Moog synthesizer, production, mixing
- Hilary Stench – bass guitar
- John Stench – drums

Additional personnel

- Fabienne Shine – backing vocals on "Off the Line" and "Shadows of a Thousand Years"

Technical

- Gary Mankin – recording
- Bernie Grundman – mastering
