= Cosmic Assault =

Studio album by Helios Creed
- Released: July 18, 1995
- Recorded: July 1994–October 1994 at North Shore Recording, Honolulu, Hawaii
- Genre: Space rock, industrial rock
- Length: 43:56
- Label: Cleopatra
- Producer: Helios Creed

Helios Creed chronology
Planet X (1994)	Cosmic Assault (1995)	Seeing Strange Lights (1996)

Professional ratings
Review scores
Source	Rating
AllMusic	3/5 stars

Cosmic Assault is the ninth album by Helios Creed, released on July 18, 1995, through Cleopatra Records.

== Track listing ==
All tracks are written by Helios Creed.

No.	Title	Length
1.	"I Condem You"	3:46
2.	"Pounders"	6:12
3.	"Rise"	3:47
4.	"The Master"	6:09
5.	"Cosmic Assault"	2:24
6.	"Leaving the Body"	4:31
7.	"The Need"	4:23
8.	"Eden's Apple"	7:20
9.	"No Peeking"	1:59
10.	"Altered States"	2:45
11.	"Military Presence"	0:40

== Personnel ==
Musicians

- Helios Creed – vocals, guitar, bass guitar, synthesizer, sampler, mixing, production
- Chris McKay – bass guitar
- Paul Della Pelle – drums
- Z Sylver – synthesizer, sampler

Production and additional personnel

- Judson Leach – mastering
