= Eclipse (Glorium album) =

Studio album by Glorium
- Released: 1997
- Recorded: 1995 at Pyramid Studio, Austin, Texas
- Genre: Post-punk
- Label: Golden Hour Records – GH29
- Producer: Kurtis D. Machler, Glorium

Glorium chronology
Past Life Recordings (1997)	Eclipse (1997)	Close Your Eyes (1997)

Eclipse is the second album by Glorium and was self-released on Golden Hour Records in 1997.

== Track listing ==
1. "Deserter" – 4:33
2. "Speaking In Tongues" – 5:10
3. "Espionage Radio" – 4:14
4. "Copilot, Keep Me Awake"+ – 5:38
5. "Dragon-Tiger Fight" – 3:40
6. "H.C. B-Day Cake For Psychic Newborn Freaks" – 5:09
7. "With It" – 2:55
8. "Blemish Party" – 3:14
9. "Room On The Floor" – 8:06

== Personnel ==
- George Lara – bass guitar
- Juan Miguel Ramos – drums
- Ernest Salaz – guitar, vocals
- Lino Max – guitar, vocals
- Paul Streckfus – vocals
- + Sarah Carlson – vocals
