= Planet X (Helios Creed album) =

Studio album by Helios Creed
- Released: October 7, 1994
- Recorded: Beet Studios, Philadelphia, Pennsylvania; North Shore Recording, Honolulu, Hawaii
- Genre: Space rock, industrial rock
- Length: 38:57
- Label: Amphetamine Reptile
- Producer: Helios Creed

Helios Creed chronology
X-Rated Fairy Tales/Superior Catholic Finger (1994)	Planet X (1994)	Cosmic Assault (1995)

Professional ratings
Review scores
Source	Rating
AllMusic	3/5 stars

Planet X is the eighth album by Helios Creed, released on October 7, 1994, through Amphetamine Reptile Records.

== Track listing ==
All tracks are written by Helios Creed, Chris McKay, Paul Della Pelle and Z Sylver.

No.	Title	Length
1.	"Tele-Vision"	5:19
2.	"Fire in the Head"	3:18
3.	"Dog Star"	3:42
4.	"Kurt Zombie"	5:36
5.	"Waves"	2:04
6.	"First Encounter"	2:50
7.	"Plato's Cave"	4:11
8.	"Won't Kill Myself"	4:05
9.	"Next Encounter"	6:24
10.	"The Ascent"	1:28

== Personnel ==
Musicians

- Helios Creed – guitar, synthesizer, sampler, mixing, production
- Chris McKay – bass guitar
- Paul Della Pelle – drums
- Z Sylver – synthesizer, sampler

Production and additional personnel

- John Boyko – engineering
