= Boxing the Clown =

Studio album by Helios Creed
- Released: September 21, 1990
- Studios: Razor's Edge, San Francisco, California
- Genre: Space rock
- Length: 30:29
- Label: Amphetamine Reptile
- Producers: Jonathan Burnside, Helios Creed, Rey Washam

Helios Creed chronology
The Last Laugh (1989)	Boxing the Clown (1990)	Lactating Purple (1991)

Professional ratings
Review scores
Source	Rating
AllMusic	4.5/5 stars
The Encyclopedia of Popular Music	3/5 stars

Boxing the Clown is the fourth album by Helios Creed, released in 1990 through Amphetamine Reptile Records.

== Track listing ==
All tracks are written by Helios Creed, Mark Duran and Rey Washam, except "Got Me Floatin'" by Jimi Hendrix.

No.	Title	Length
1.	"Master Blaster"	1:59
2.	"Sunspots"	2:39
3.	"Black Hole"	2:46
4.	"Got Me Floatin'"	2:36
5.	"Go Blind"	2:18
6.	"Hyperventilation"	2:21
7.	"Sister Sarah"	6:01
8.	"Neptune"	3:45
9.	"Big Clown"	5:58

== Personnel ==
Musicians

- Helios Creed – vocals, guitar, sampler, production
- Mark Duran – bass guitar
- Rey Washam – drums, percussion, production

Production and additional personnel

- Jonathan Burnside – production, engineering
- Tom Hazelmyer – cover art
