= X-Rated Fairy Tales =

Studio album by Helios Creed
- Released: 1985
- Recorded: Hyde Street, San Francisco, California
- Genre: Industrial rock, psychedelic rock, space rock
- Length: 37:07
- Label: Subterranean; Fundamental
- Producer: Helios Creed

Helios Creed chronology
X-Rated Fairy Tales (1985)	Superior Catholic Finger (1989)

Professional ratings
Review scores
Source	Rating
AllMusic	4/5 stars
The Encyclopedia of Popular Music	2/5 stars

X-Rated Fairy Tales is the debut album by the rock musician Helios Creed. It was released in 1985 on Subterranean Records.

== Track listing ==
All tracks are written by Helios Creed.

Side one
No.	Title	Length
1.	"The Descent"	4:08
2.	"Un-Human Condition"	3:33
3.	"Invitation"	2:52
4.	"X-Rated Fairy Tales"	4:23
5.	"Blood Red"	3:02

Side two
No.	Title	Length
1.	"Mystery Room"	4:07
2.	"Showdown"	2:51
3.	"Sex Voodoo Venus"	4:32
4.	"Money Man"	3:41
5.	"Johnny"	3:52

== Personnel ==
Musicians

- John Carlan – synthesizer
- Helios Creed – vocals, guitar, synthesizer on "X-Rated Fairy Tales", production
- Mark Duran – bass guitar
- Bill Roth – drums, tambourine, maracas, percussion, synthesizer

Production and additional personnel

- Mike Hills – photography, design
- Elena Holt – backing vocals on "X-Rated Fairy Tales"
- George Horn – mastering
- Ricky Lee Lynd – engineering
