= Randy Turner =

American singer

Randy J. "Biscuit" Turner (November 25, 1949 – August 19, 2005) was an American punk singer and artist. He was the lead singer for the seminal hardcore punk band Big Boys, formed in Austin in the late 1970s. Turner is regarded as a pioneer bi performer in the world of punk rock.

== Biography ==
=== Early years ===
Randy J. "Biscuit" Turner was born November 25, 1949, in Gladewater, Texas, United States.

=== Musical career ===
Turner's band, Big Boys, along with The Dicks, Really Red, and MDC, are credited with the development of hardcore punk in Texas, while it was simultaneously emerging in other cities as well. They were one of the earliest skate punk groups, were featured in Thrasher skateboarding magazine and videos, and had their own Big Boys skateboard.

The group also is known for being the first punk band to introduce funk rhythms into hardcore, influencing later bands such as Red Hot Chili Peppers. Turner was noted for outrageous stage antics, such as wearing a pink ballerina's tutu and pink cowboy boots while performing.

Queried about his sexuality by Flipside magazine in 1982, "Biscuit" Turner replied:

"I don't know if I want to answer that or not because it doesn't make any difference if I'm gay or not, I'm a human being and my sexual preference doesn't play into my lifestyle. It comes from my heart and I want people to look at me and say I'm a human being — don't ask me about what 5% of my life is."

In his musical career, Turner also played with Cargo Cult, Texas Biscuit Bombs, Naugahyde Dream Sequence, and Swine King, the last of which contributed a song to Outpunk Records' seminal queercore compilation CD Outpunk Dance Party.

=== Other pursuits ===
Turner also took many turns in the theatre and performance realm. He was well known as a spoken word poet and was welcomed at many readings in Austin's busy slam poetry scene. He took several turns as the "penalty diva" for TXRD Lonestar Rollergirls around 2003, after the death of his friend Amberdiva who had held that position. He performed in 1992 in an award winning production of "Our Town" at Zachary Scott Theatre, playing both the professor and the reverend.

Biscuit was an avid collector, garage sale maniac, and found object artist. His house was a treasure trove of Americana and he decorated the outside with all sorts of sculptural creations and lights during the holidays. Neighbors and kids often stopped to gawk at his creations and "finds" that surrounded his South Austin home.

=== Death and legacy ===
Turner was found dead in his home in south Austin on August 19, 2005. The cause of death was reported to be cirrhosis of the liver due to a chronic, untreated hepatitis C infection. He was preparing for a show of his artwork scheduled to open just a few days after he died. He was featured on the cover of the local independent newspaper, The Austin Chronicle, which was released the day after his death.

In 2004, in a song called "Ode", from the CD Complete Discography, the queercore band Limp Wrist pay homage to Randy Turner, along with Gary Floyd of The Dicks and Joshua Plague of Mukilteo Fairies and Behead the Prophet, No Lord Shall Live, for being pioneering gay punks in the hardcore scene who have paved the way for Limp Wrist.
