= Superior Catholic Finger =

Studio album by Helios Creed
- Released: 1989
- Genres: Industrial rock, space rock, alternative rock, hard rock
- Length: 32:01
- Label: Subterranean
- Producer: Helios Creed

Helios Creed chronology
X-Rated Fairy Tales (1985)	Superior Catholic Finger (1989)	The Last Laugh (1989)

Professional ratings
Review scores
Source	Rating
AllMusic	4.5/5 stars
The Encyclopedia of Popular Music	3/5 stars

Superior Catholic Finger is the second studio album by Helios Creed. It was released in 1989 on Subterranean Records.

== Track listing ==
All tracks are written by Helios Creed, except "Mustard Dog" by Mark Duran.

Side one
No.	Title	Length
1.	"Monster Lust"	6:12
2.	"Mustard Dog"	1:26
3.	"Superior Catholic Finger"	4:13
4.	"Too Bad"	3:53

Side two
No.	Title	Length
1.	"The Bridge"	2:01
2.	"Who Cares"	4:39
3.	"The Cookie Jar"	5:13
4.	"Weekends"	3:44

== Personnel ==
Musicians

- John Carlan – synthesizer
- Helios Creed – vocals, guitar, sampler, production
- Mark Duran – bass guitar
- Tod Preuss – drums

Production and additional personnel

- Jonathan Burnside – engineering
- George Horn – mastering
- Dan Richards – cover art
- Steven Tupper – design
