= Lactating Purple =

Studio album by Helios Creed
- Released: 1991
- Studios: Razor's Edge, San Francisco, California
- Genres: Space rock, noise rock
- Length: 30:38
- Label: Amphetamine Reptile
- Producer: Helios Creed

Helios Creed chronology
Boxing the Clown (1990)	Lactating Purple (1991)	Kiss to the Brain (1992)

Lactating Purple is an album by Helios Creed, released in 1991 through Amphetamine Reptile Records.

== Critical reception ==
Professional ratings
Review scores
Source	Rating
AllMusic	4/5 stars

Spin called the album "amazing nonmetal heavy metal for science-fiction minds."

== Track listing ==
All tracks are written by Helios Creed.

No.	Title	Length
1.	"Lactating Purple"	2:52
2.	"Flying Through the Either"	2:24
3.	"Ub the Wall"	3:12
4.	"Nebuchadnezzar"	3:04
5.	"Modular Green"	5:13
6.	"Big Bang"	3:35
7.	"The Radiated"	1:56
8.	"Spider"	2:58
9.	"Martian Sperm & Bagpipes"	2:49
10.	"Amenti"	2:28

== Personnel ==
Musicians

- Helios Creed – vocals, guitar, sampler, synthesizer, production
- Paul Kirk – bass guitar
- Paul Della Pelle – drums
- Z Sylver – synthesizer, sampler

Production and additional personnel

- Billy Anderson – engineering
- Jonathan Burnside – engineering
