= The Last Laugh (Helios Creed album) =

Studio album by Helios Creed
- Released: 1989
- Studios: Reciprocal, Seattle, Washington
- Genre: Space rock
- Length: 37:47
- Label: Amphetamine Reptile
- Producers: Helios Creed, Jack Endino

Helios Creed chronology
Superior Catholic Finger (1989)	The Last Laugh (1989)	Boxing the Clown (1990)

The Last Laugh is an album by Helios Creed, released in 1989 through Amphetamine Reptile Records.

== Critical reception ==
Professional ratings
Review scores
Source	Rating
AllMusic	4.5/5 stars

The Washington Times wrote: "Mr. Creed's guitar sometimes seems as driven as a runaway 18-wheeler on a steep incline. At other times, the woolly effects on his instrument submerge the listener in a sort of aural-oceanic landscape."

== Track listing ==
All tracks are written by Helios Creed, Daniel House and Jason Finn.

No.	Title	Length
1.	"Some Way Out/The Dream/The Diplomat"	6:22
2.	"Bend Over"	4:07
3.	"Nirbasion Annasion"	4:09
4.	"Road Out of Hell"	4:44
5.	"Late Bloomer"	4:07
6.	"Where the Children Are"	3:50
7.	"The Rant"	1:48
8.	"Resurrection Blue"	5:18
9.	"Beef"	3:18

== Personnel ==
Musicians

- Helios Creed – vocals, guitar, production
- Daniel House – bass guitar
- Jason Finn – drums

Production and additional personnel

- Jack Endino – production
- Tom Hazelmyer – cover art
- Charles Peterson – photography
