= Dicks (band) =

Punk band from Austin, Texas

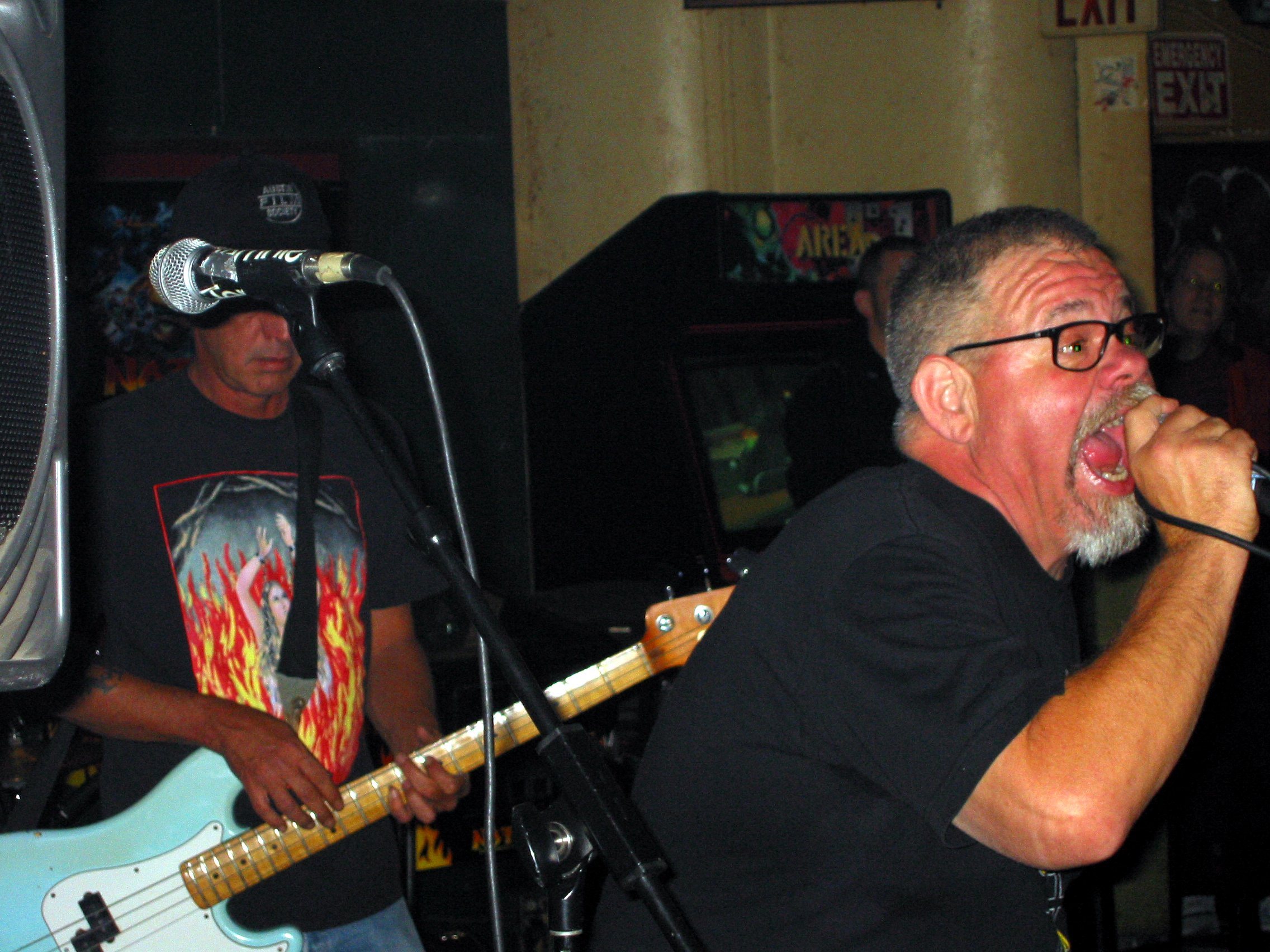
- Dicks performing in Austin, Texas in 2005; pictured left to right: Buxf Parrott and Gary Floyd

Background information
- Origin: Austin, Texas
- Genre: Hardcore punk
- Years active: 1980–1986; 2004–2016
- Labels: R Radical, SST, Alternative Tentacles
- Past members: Gary Floyd; Buxf Parrott; Pat Deason; Glen Taylor; Debbie Gordon; Tim Carroll; Lynn Perko; Sebastian Fuchs; Brian Magee; Davy Jones; Mark Kenyon

Dicks were an American punk rock band from Austin, Texas, formed in 1980 and initially disbanded in 1986. After the first breakup, singer Gary Floyd formed the band Sister Double Happiness, with drummer Lynn Perko, then later fronted a project called Black Kali Ma. In 2004, The Dicks reunited and were active until 2016.

The Dicks went through two incarnations in the 1980s, changing their lineup when Floyd moved from Austin to San Francisco in 1983. As a political band with Marxist lyrics during the Reagan Era, they did not shy from controversy. Floyd was one of a handful of openly gay musicians in the 1980s punk scene.

== History ==
=== Austin lineup (1980–1983) ===
Dicks were formed in Austin in 1980 by Gary Floyd, Buxf Parrott, Pat Deason, and Glen Taylor. Their first single "Dicks Hate The Police", released in 1980, brought them much attention and is now regarded as a classic hardcore punk record. In the song Floyd sings from the perspective of a policeman who abuses his power by targeting minorities and abusing civilians.

Dicks often played shows with fellow pioneering Texas hardcore bands MDC, The Offenders, and The Big Boys; Dicks' full-length debut was the split album with The Big Boys, Live at Raul's Club. Dicks were among the first punk bands to address issues of homophobia and sexual identity, as in such songs as "Saturday Night at the Bookstore" and "Off-Duty Sailor".

=== San Francisco lineup (1983–1986) ===
In 1983, Floyd left Texas for San Francisco along with Debbie Gordon, the band's manager, who was considered a member of the band. Floyd and Gordon, along with new members Tim Carroll, Sebastian Fuchs, and Lynn Perko (formerly of all-women band The Wrecks), formed a second incarnation of Dicks. The LP Kill From The Heart was released in 1983 on SST Records and These People followed in 1985 on Alternative Tentacles. The group disbanded in 1986, although occasional one-off reunion shows featuring the Austin lineup occurred through the 1980s and 1990s.

=== Breakup and continuing influence ===
The band remained influential in punk and underground circuits. San Antonio's Butthole Surfers had ended their 1984 album Psychic... Powerless... Another Man's Sac with the cowpunk anthem "Gary Floyd" in tribute to the Dicks' bandleader. Dicks saw a resurgence in popularity during the popularity of grunge when Seattle band Mudhoney released a cover of Dicks' "Hate The Police" on Sub Pop Records. Soon after, Chicago noise rockers The Jesus Lizard (three fourths of whom were also from Austin) released their cover version of Dicks' "Wheelchair Epidemic".

Gary Floyd later started Sister Double Happiness in San Francisco in 1986. After that band ended he formed and primarily played in Europe with The Gary Floyd Band; an overview of this material, "Backdoor Preacher Man", is available in the United States. Toward the late 1990s, Floyd played in Black Kali Ma, who released an album on Alternative Tentacles. Floyd later formed the band the Buddha Brothers, while Parrott and Deason went on to play in the Austin neo-bluegrass band Shootin' Pains and Trouser Trout, while Parrott and Taylor also played in Pretty Mouth. Perko went on to join Imperial Teen.

=== Reunion, disbandment and Gary Floyd's death (2004–2024) ===
In 2004, Dicks began playing regular reunion concerts in Austin and elsewhere. The lineup for the shows consists of the original Dicks, with the exception of Glen Taylor, who died in 1997. His role was filled by three other Austin guitarists: Mark Kenyon, Brian McGee, and Davy Jones. At the 2009 Austin Music Awards show, Jesus Lizard singer David Yow joined the band onstage for "Wheelchair Epidemic". At the same show, Dicks were inducted into the Texas Music Hall of Fame.

A documentary film, The Dicks from Texas, was released in 2015 about the Dicks and Austin, Texas punk scene along with a tribute album, The Dicks From Texas and Friends, with 27 bands covering 28 Dicks songs.

The Dicks announced that their final show would be October 30, 2016, at Grizzly Hall in Austin, Texas; however, due to popular demand, a second show was added the day afterward.

On May 2, 2024, Gary Floyd, aged 71, died after a series of health-related issues, widowing his husband.

== Members ==
- Gary Floyd – vocals (1980–1986, 2004–2016); died 2024
- Buxf Parrott – bass, guitar, vocals (1980–1983, 2004–2016)
- Pat Deason – drums (1980–1983, 2004–2016)
- Glen Taylor – guitar, bass (1980–1983); died 1997
- Debbie Gordon – manager (1982–1986)
- Tim Carroll – guitar (1983–1986)
- Lynn Perko – drums (1983–1986)
- Sebastian Fuchs – bass, vocals (1983–1986)
- Mark Kenyon – guitar (2004–2016)
- Brian Magee – guitar (2004–2005, 2016)
- Davy Jones – guitar (2005–2015); died 2015

Timeline

== Discography ==
=== Albums ===
- Kill from the Heart LP (1983), SST Records
- These People LP (1985), Alternative Tentacles

=== 10" ===
- Ten Inches 10-inch (2006), Delta Pop Music

=== Lives ===
- Live at Raul's Club LP (1980), Rat Race – Split with The Big Boys
- Dicks Live! Hungry Butt (2006), Hot Box Review

=== Singles, EPs ===
- "Hate the Police" 7-inch (1980), R Radical Records
- Peace? 7-inch EP (1984), R Radical Records: "No Fuckin' War"/"I Hope You Get Drafted"/"Nobody Asked Me"
- Live at Raul's 2×7″ (1992), Selfless Records - split with The Big Boys
- Hog 7-inch (2006), Delta Pop Music

=== Compilations ===
- 1980–1986 CD (1997), Alternative Tentacles (compilation of out of print material)

=== Compilation appearances ===
- "Gilbeau" on Cottage Cheese from the Lips of Death (1983), Ward 9 Records
- "I Hope You Get Drafted" on the International P.E.A.C.E. Benefit Compilation (1984), R Radical Records
- "Legacy of Man" on Rat Music for Rat People Vol. 2 (1984), CD Presents, Ltd

== See also ==
- List of hardcore punk bands
