= Big Boys (band) =

American punk rock band

The Big Boys
- Origin: Austin, Texas, United States
- Genres: Punk rock; skate punk; funk punk; hardcore punk; post-punk
- Years active: 1979–1984
- Labels: Moment Productions; Wasted Talent; Enigma Records
- Past members: Randy "Biscuit" Turner; Tim Kerr; Chris Gates; Steve Collier; Greg Murray; Fred Schultz; Rey Washam

Big Boys were an American pioneering punk rock band who are credited with having helped to create and introduce skate punk as a new style of music, which became popular in the 1980s. They also were famous for bringing elements of funk into their hardcore punk style.

== History ==
=== Formation ===
Formed in 1977 in Austin, Texas, United States, the original band members were Randy "Biscuit" Turner on vocals, Tim Kerr on guitar and Chris Gates on bass. The key members of the band were childhood friends for a decade before the band was started. Over the years the group played with five drummers in all; Steve Collier, Greg Murray, Fred Schultz, Rey Washam and Kevin Tubb who played only one show (the band's first) because Collier was sick.

The hardcore punk style, a development from the earlier punk sound, arose spontaneously in various cities, but in Austin it was represented by MDC, Big Boys, the Huns, the Skunks and the Dicks. The bands often played together; Big Boys and the Dicks jointly released a split single and an LP, Live At Raul's.

Big Boys shows were legendary, frequently involving food fights, with "Biscuit" frequently sporting a pink ballerina's tutu and pink cowboy boots. Invitations would be made to the audience to come up and sing along, which often occurred. At the end of early shows, the band was famous for yelling, "OK y'all, go start your own band."

Queried about his sexuality by Flipside magazine in 1982, "Biscuit" Turner replied:

"I don't know if I want to answer that or not because it doesn't make any difference if I'm gay or not, I'm a human being and my sexual preference doesn't play into my lifestyle. It comes from my heart and I want people to look at me and say I'm a human being — don't ask me about what 5% of my life is."

=== Musical importance ===
Big Boys are credited as well with the introduction of funk rhythms to hardcore punk, producing funk metal, an innovation influential on later bands such as Red Hot Chili Peppers, who actually opened up for the Big Boys in Hollywood, leading to Red Hot Chili Peppers being referred to as "the Little Big Boys". This credit is due in no small part to the addition of a horn section, the Impromptu Horns, spearheaded by Chris Gates' brother, Nathan. The Impromptu Horns played mainly local shows, and played on some of the funkiest tracks recorded by Big Boys. Horn players included Nathan Gates, David Kitto and Tim Kopra on trombones; Brent Fawns and David Griffy on trumpets.

They were also one of the first bands involved in the skatepunk scene, appearing in Thrasher skateboarding magazine and on Thrasher's Skate Rock compilation records, and had their own Big Boys skateboard, the artwork of which was designed by the members themselves and produced by Zorlac Skateboards. After a Bad Brains show in Austin that ended in controversy involving Biscuit (and later inspired the songs "Brickwall" by Big Boys and "Pay to Come Along" by MDC), conflicts began to arise within the band, specifically between Biscuit and Chris. Big Boys played their last show very unexpectedly. Biscuit and Chris never spoke to each other again.

=== Aftermath ===
Tim Kerr went on to play with many bands, including Poison 13, Bad Mutha Goose, Monkeywrench, Jack O Fire, Lord High Fixers and, in 2004, the Total Sound Group Direct Action Committee.

Chris Gates was also with Poison 13, Junkyard and Charter Bulldogs. Gates can currently be heard fronting Big Chris Gates and Gatesville, a southern-fried country group based in Austin.

Horn player Tim Kopra became an astronaut and commander of the International Space Station.

Drummer Rey Washam has played consistently with such groups as Jerryskids, Scratch Acid, Rapeman, and Ministry. Original drummer Steve Collier switched from drums to guitar and formed Doctors' Mob, whose first album was produced by Chris Gates, and later played in the Sidehackers and the Rite Flyers.

Randy Turner performed with the Slurpees, Cargo Cult, and Swine King, the latter band contributing the song "All Broke Down" to Outpunk Records' compilation, Outpunk Dance Party. Randy Turner was found dead from Hepatitis C complications in his home on August 18, 2005, at the same time he was featured on the cover of that week's The Austin Chronicle.

The Big Boys also appeared in the well-reviewed 2006 Sundance film, American Hardcore. Their song "Brickwall" appeared on the soundtrack.

Big Boys were innovative in many ways and were influential in the direction music and music scenes would take in their wake.

== Discography ==
=== Singles ===
- Frat Cars 7" single (1980) on Big Boys Records
- Wipe Out/I'm Sorry Fear and Loathing fanzine promo 7"
- Fun, Fun, Fun... 12" EP (1982) on Moment Productions

=== Albums ===
- Live at Raul's Club split LP with the Dicks (1980) on Rat Race (1981)
- Where's My Towel/Industry Standard on Wasted Talent (1981)
- Lullabies Help the Brain Grow on Moment Productions (1983)
- No Matter How Long the Line at the Cafeteria, There's Always a Seat on Enigma (1984)

=== Compilations ===
- Thrasher Magazine Skate Rock!, Vol.1 (High Speed Productions, 1983)
- Rat Music for Rat People, Vol. 2 (CD Presents, 1984)
- Wreck Collection LP on The Unseen Hand (1988) (reissued on CD by Gern Blandsten in 2002).
- The Skinny Elvis CD on Touch and Go Records (1993)
- The Fat Elvis CD on Touch and Go Records (1993)
- Lullabies Help the Brain Grow/No Matter How Long the Line at the Cafeteria, There's Always a Seat double LP on X-Mist Records (2004)
- Texas Funk Compilation Cass. on Rastaman Work Ethic Productions (1990)

== See also ==
- List of hardcore punk bands
