= Tim Kerr (musician) =

- Born: March 11, 1956 (age 70); Freeport, Texas, U.S.
- Origin: USA
- Genres: Hardcore punk, skate punk, punk funk, post-punk
- Occupations: musician, visual artist
- Instruments: guitar, banjo, button accordion
- Labels: Touch & Go; Estrus; Sympathy For The Record Industry; In The Red; Sub Pop; Kill Rock Stars; Gern Blandsten; Don Giovanni
- Website: www.timkerr.net/home.htm

Tim Kerr (born March 11, 1956) is an American musician, visual artist and photographer.

Kerr was born and raised in Freeport, Texas, now living in Austin, Texas. His first art award was winning a fire prevention poster contest in elementary school. He moved to Austin after high school graduation where he still resides with his wife Beth. He earned a degree in painting and photography at the University of Texas in Austin and studied the latter with Garry Winogrand. Tim was awarded a Ford Foundation Grant while at UT. He won a slot two years in a row for the new songwriters contest at the Kerrville Folk Festival during this time as well.

== Music ==
After college graduation, Kerr became involved musically and artistically with the early stages of the DIY (Do It Yourself) punk/hardcore/self expression movement. The idea that anyone could and should participate in self-expression burst every door and window inside of him wide open. He was a key member in bands that have made recordings for such labels as Touch & Go, Estrus, Sympathy For The Record Industry, In The Red, Sub Pop, and Kill Rock Stars. Tim also produced and recorded bands for all the labels above and more, both in the US and overseas. Journalists and critics have cited the bands that Tim played in as major factors in starting everything from funk-punk, skaterock, grunge, and garage; and all have played an important role in what is known, for better or worse [?], as the US indie scene today. The Big Boys, Poison 13, Bad Mutha Goose, Lord High Fixers and Monkeywrench are just some of the bands Tim was a founding member of. Some of Tim's art from the 1980s has been featured in books depicting that period. He has shared bills with the likes of Grace Jones, Pearl Jam, Nirvana, Fugazi, Black Flag, Africa Bambaataa, and X to name a few. He has toured in the United States and abroad.

He has composed and recorded music for several choreographers who work in Austin. These pieces have been performed in Austin, New York, and California.

He created soundtrack work for films such as Bill Daniel's documentary, "Who is Bozo Texino?", and Jan Krawitz documentary, "Drive In Blues".

== Artwork ==
Some of Tim's art from his early music years is now in books depicting that period. Tim's art is included on album covers, posters, skateboard graphics, and advertisements. A book devoted to Tim's art has been reissued through Monofonus Press.

Tim now shows his artwork in the US and abroad from galleries including PS1 in New York, 96 Gillespie in London, Slowboy Gallery in Germany, Thirdman Records, and Hyde Park Art Center in Chicago. He was honored to have been selected as the first artist for the Arlington Transit's Art On The Bus program in 2010. He has also been involved in painting murals in Texas, Nashville, New York, California, and Montgomery. The summer of 2015, Tim had a solo show at the Rosa Parks Museum. He was also given a residency through Void Gallery in Derry, Northern Ireland, AS220 in Providence, and I.A.M. in Berlin. Tim was also asked by artist Matt Stokes to help with his pieces The Gainsborough Packet (The Baltic & 176 Gallery), These Are The Days (AMOA), and Catata Profana.

From 1990 till 2000, along with his library job, he also worked in a stained glass studio building windows, fusing and sandblasting glass.

== Awards and acknowledgements ==
Tim was inducted into the Texas Music Hall of Fame by popular vote in 1996 which he says he is still honored, humbled, and confused by. The Experience Music Project Museum in Seattle asked to record an oral history with him in 2000 and he has donated a lot of his personal archives to the Austin History Library.

There are many interviews with Tim in a variety of magazines, webzines, newspapers, and books. He has been asked to speak on panels and also gave a talk at the college in Ljubljana, Slovenia about himself and his involvement then and now. He is included in two upcoming documentaries; one about his life and work, and another one about his first band the Big Boys.

Kerr has never felt comfortable with labels and their restrictions. He continues to paint and plays Irish and Old Time music with friends in Austin and wherever his travels take him.
