= Rey Washam =

American drummer (born 1961)

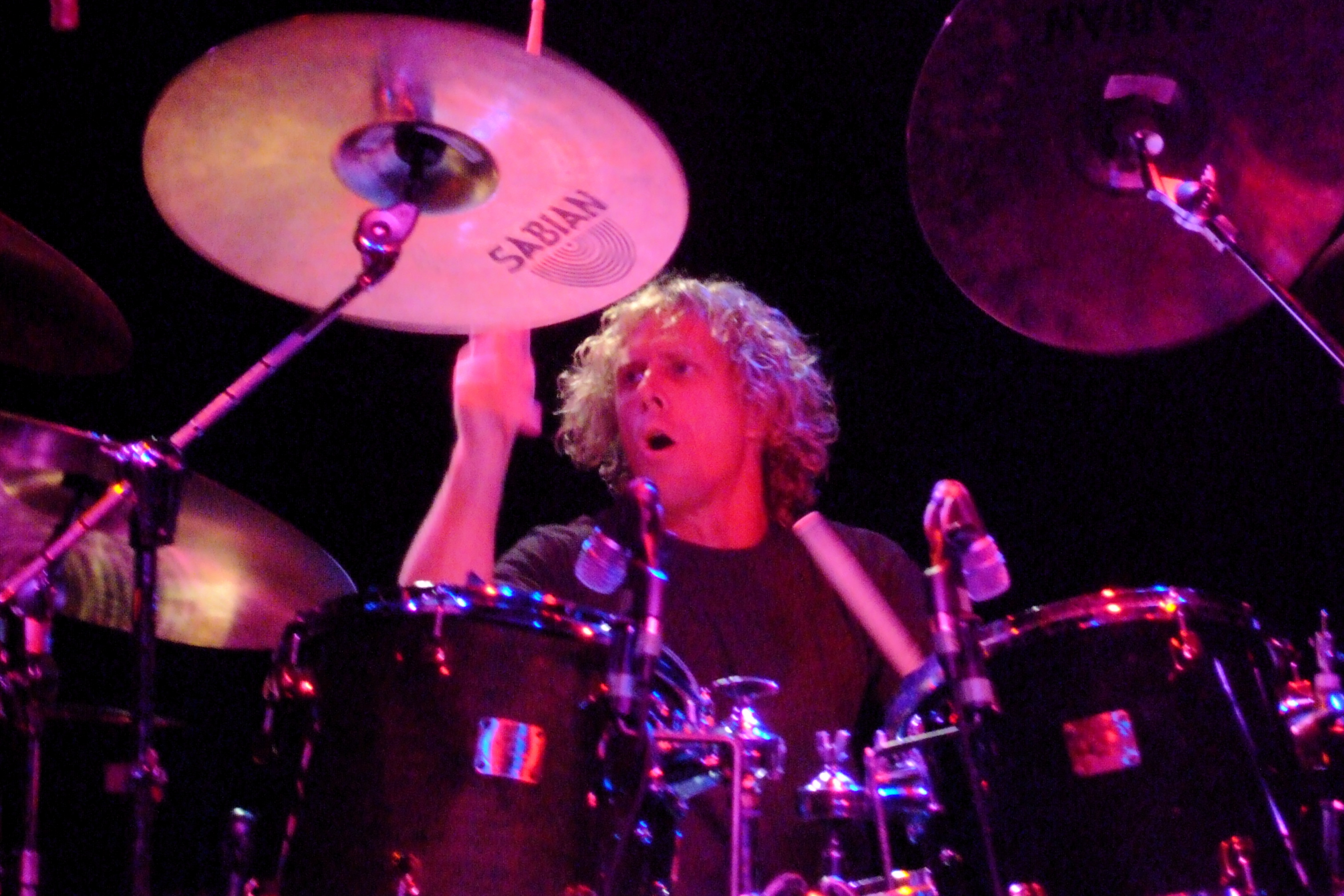
- Washam with Scratch Acid in 2006

Background information
- Birth name: Reynolds Washam
- Born: March 14, 1961 (age 64); Austin, Texas, U.S.
- Genres: Rock, punk
- Occupation: Drummer

Reynolds Washam (born March 14, 1961) is an American Grammy nominated drummer, who has been performing for more than 35 years. He has collaborated with many bands, the most notable of which include: Scratch Acid, Rapeman, Ministry, the Big Boys, Helios Creed, the Didjits, Lard, Tad and Butthole Surfers offshoot Daddy Longhead. Washam also played jazz with a band, Euripides Pants, that recorded an unreleased album.

Washam performed with a temporarily reunited Scratch Acid in the Touch and Go Records 25th anniversary concert, which took place on September 9, 2006, in Chicago, Illinois. The Chicago show also spawned two other reunion shows: in Austin, Texas prior to the Touch and Go Records 25th anniversary concert, and September 16, 2006, in Seattle, Washington.

Rey joined the three other original members of Scratch Acid for a Fall and Winter tour in 2011. Reynolds graduated from Lloyd V. Berkner High School in 1979.
