= Damon Edge =

American musician (1949–1995)

Background information
- Born: Thomas Edward Wisse; November 12, 1949; Los Angeles, California, U.S.
- Died: August 11, 1995 (aged 45) Redondo Beach, California, U.S.
- Genres: post punk, Industrial rock, Psychedelic rock, experimental rock, sound collage
- Occupations: Musician, songwriter, producer
- Instruments: Vocals, keyboards, percussions
- Years active: 1976–1995
- Formerly of: Chrome

Thomas Edward "Tom" Wisse (November 12, 1949 – August 11, 1995), known professionally as Damon Edge, was an American musician. He was a founding member of the post-punk band Chrome and also recorded as a solo artist.

== Biography ==
Damon Edge was born in Los Angeles in 1949. He graduated from Inglewood High School in 1967 before attending the California Institute of the Arts. He earned a bachelor's degree in environmental arts in 1970. He started the band Chrome in 1976, taking inspiration from some of his teachers at Cal Arts and from a trip to Europe, where he heard Arabic music for the first time. He produced a lot of the early Chrome cover artwork.

He began working at MGM and jamming with other musicians to create soundtracks for film. After recording the first Chrome album he set up Siren Records to release his own recordings. He moved to San Francisco in the mid 1970s and began recording further Chrome material. In the 1980s he moved to France after marrying the singer Fabienne Shine. He recorded several albums while living in France, some under his own name and others as Chrome. Edge and Shine returned to the U.S. in 1988, living in the Hollywood Hills, but they divorced in the early 1990s.

=== Death ===
In August 1995 Edge was found dead in his Redondo Beach apartment in California. He had been lying undiscovered for about a month until a neighbor alerted the police. After the breakup with his wife he had begun to drink and smoke heavily. He had recently finished a new solo album in Germany.

== Discography (solo albums) ==
- Alliance (1985)
- I'm a Gentleman (7") (1985)
- The Wind Is Talking (1985)
- Grand Visions (1986)
- The Surreal Rock (1987)
