= Helios Creed =

American musician

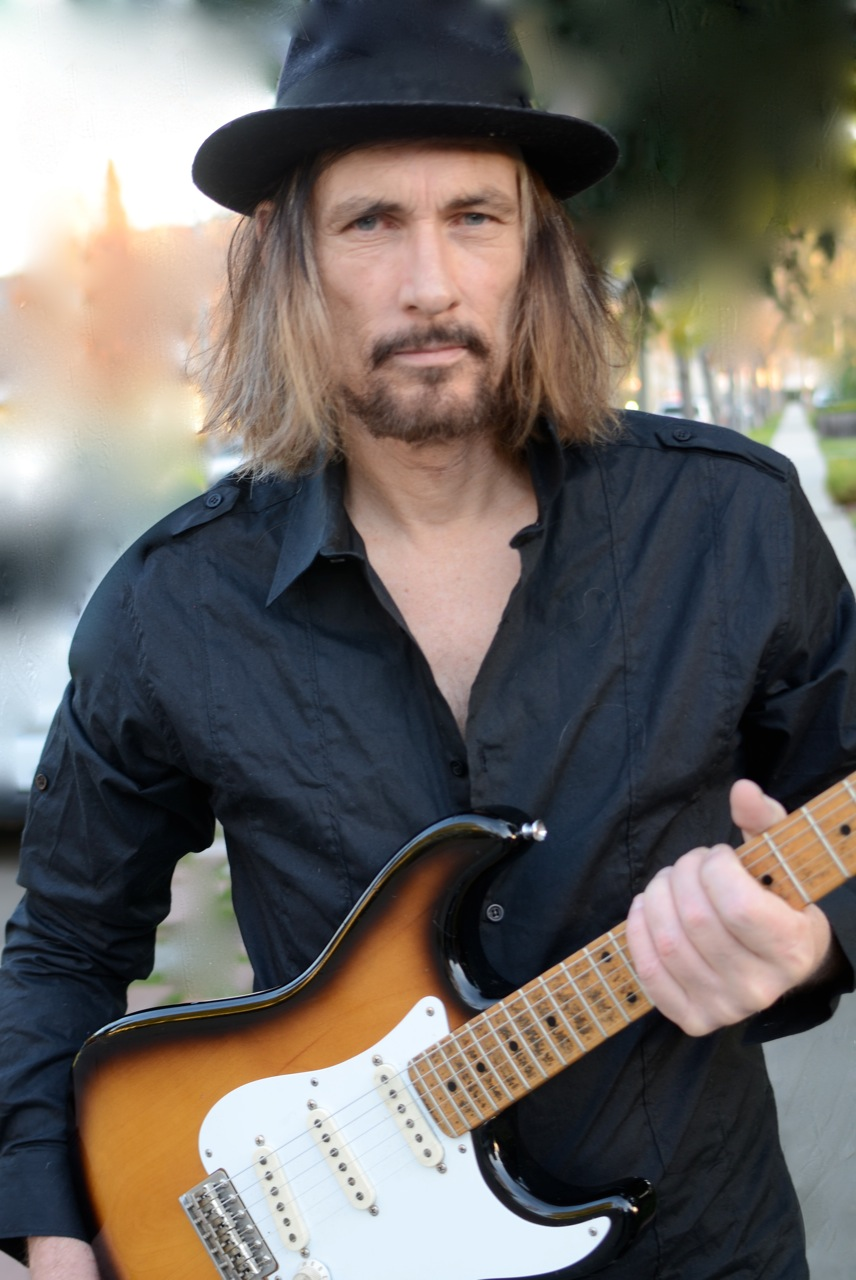
- Helios Creed in 2012

Background information
- Born: Barry Johnson; November 3, 1953 (age 72); Long Beach, California, U.S.
- Occupation: Musician
- Instruments: Guitar, vocals

Barry Johnson (born on November 3, 1953), known professionally as Helios Creed, is an American guitarist, singer and bandleader. He first came to prominence in the mid-1970s with the San Francisco band Chrome, who were considered an early influence on industrial rock. Chrome broke up in the mid-1980s when founding member Damon Edge moved to Paris. Helios then recruited some local hard rock musicians and launched a solo career.

== Early life ==
Creed was born Barry Johnson in Long Beach, California, and moved to Hawaii when he was six. His brother, two years older, introduced him to psychedelic music. When he was 12, his parents bought him his first guitar, and he became a serious student of the instrument immediately. Creed has said that he invented his trademark sound while trying to replicate the sound he heard in his head while "listening to Black Sabbath on LSD on headphones when I was a teenager". He moved to San Francisco in the mid-1970s, where he joined Chrome.

== History ==
Other members of Creed's band have included Bill Roth, Paul Della Pelle, and Rey Washam on drums, Paul "Bean" Kirk and Mark Duran on bass, and a mysterious woman named "Z" on keyboards. The music is usually mid-tempo to slow-tempo space rock, hard rock, acid rock.

The band Butthole Surfers, among many others, have cited Helios Creed as a major influence. Creed also worked with the band, contributing guitar to their album Independent Worm Saloon, and the Surfers' Gibby Haynes and Jeff Pinkus collaborated on several of Creed's albums. Weird-pop sensations MGMT have cited Helios and Chrome as influences. MGMT has had Helios open for them on tour.

Helios has released records on Sub Pop, Amphetamine Reptile, Cleopatra and other indie labels. He plays extra guitar on the song "Gentle Collapse" on the Fist Sized Chunks album by Skin Yard. Helios also played on the albums Prophets Of Time and Sphynx by Nik Turner of Hawkwind. Turner played saxophone on Helios' album Busting Through the Van Allan Belt.

Creed uses a large number of effects on his voice and his guitar, including echoes, phase shifters, flangers, guitar synthesizers, fuzz, and octave dividers.

Creed has lived in Hawaii, San Francisco, and Kansas; he currently lives in California. He still tours occasionally.

His latest album, 2011's Galactic Octopi, was produced by Michael Sheppard of the Transparency record label. Creed is an avid model-railroad enthusiast.

He is the father of two sons and a daughter. Creed is 6'4" tall.

== Discography ==
- X-Rated Fairy Tales (1985)
- Superior Catholic Finger (1989)
- The Last Laugh (1989)
- Boxing the Clown (1990)
- Lactating Purple (1991)
- Kiss to the Brain (1992)
- Your Choice Live Series (1993)
- Planet X (1994)
- Busting Through the Van Allan Belt (1994)
- Cosmic Assault (1995)
- "NUGG" The Transport (1996)
- Activated Condition (1998)
- Chromagnum Man (1998)
- Colors of Light (1999)
- On Tour 1999 (2001)
- Spider Prophecy (2002)
- On the Dark Side of the Sun (2003)
- Inferior Plastic Finger (2004)
- Deep Blue Love Vacuum (2006)
- Not Without Sorcery (2008)
- Galactic Octopi (2011)

=== Side projects ===
Creed released two albums under the name Dark Matter. The Dark Matter albums are more electronic and ambient (space music) than his guitar solo work, and performed by old musician acquaintances of his Hilary (bass) and John Stench (drums).

- Seeing Strange Lights (1996)
- Dark Matter Vol. 2 (1998)
