= Duane Denison discography =

This article details the discography of American guitarist Duane Denison. He is recognized for his work with the bands The Jesus Lizard and Tomahawk, as well as his collaborations in The Denison/Kimball Trio.

He has also recorded with Bobby Bare Jr., Andrew Bird, Buñuel, EmptyMansions, Firewater, Beverley Knight, the Legendary Shack Shakers, Laura J. Martin, Pigface, Revolting Cocks, Silver Jews, Sally Timms, Jack White and Hank Williams III, among others.

Denison has worked with producers as varied as Steve Albini, Paul Allen, Joe Barresi, John Cale, Andy Gill, Mark Nevers, Garth Richardson, Dave Sardy, and many more.

== The Jesus Lizard ==
Denison played guitar and co-wrote on all seven of the band's studio albums, plus numerous EPs and singles.

=== Studio albums ===
Title	Album details	Peak chart positions
Title	Album details	US Heat.
Head	Released: 1989; Label: Touch and Go; Format: CD, CS, LP	—
Goat	Released: February 21, 1991; Label: Touch and Go; Format: CD, CS, LP	—
Liar	Released: October 10, 1992; Label: Touch and Go; Format: CD, CS, LP	—
Down	Released: August 26, 1994; Label: Touch and Go; Format: CD, CS, LP	—
Shot	Released: April 16, 1996; Label: Capitol; Format: CD, CS, LP	28
Blue	Released: April 23, 1998; Label: Capitol; Format: CD, CS, LP	—
Rack	Released: September 13, 2024; Label: Ipecac	—
"—" denotes a release that did not chart.

=== Extended plays ===
Title	Album details
Pure	Released: 1989; Label: Touch and Go; Format: CD, CS, LP
Lash	Released: August 20, 1993; Label: Touch and Go; Format: CD, CS, LP
The Jesus Lizard	Released: February 17, 1998; Label: Jetset; Format: CD, LP
Flux	Released: April 12, 2025; Label: Ipecac; Format: LP

=== Singles ===
Year	Title	Album
1989	"Chrome"	Non-album single
1990	"Mouthbreather"	Goat
1992	"Wheelchair Epidemic"	Non-album single
1992	"Gladiator"	Liar
1993	"Puss"	Liar
1993	"(Fly) On (The Wall)"	Down
1996	"Shot"	Shot
1996	"Mailman"	Shot
1996	"Thumper"	Shot
1998	"A Tale of Two Women"	Blue

== Tomahawk ==
Denison co-wrote and played guitar, plus occasional bass, on the band's five studio albums, including bass on Anonymous.

=== Studio albums ===
Year	Album details	Peak chart positions					
Year	Album details	US	US Heat.	US Ind.	AUS	NOR	UK
2001	Tomahawk: Released: October 30, 2001; Label: Ipecac (18); Format: CD	—	31	20	37	—	—
2003	Mit Gas: Released: May 6, 2003; Label: Ipecac (40); Format: CD	137	3	7	28	17	98
2007	Anonymous: Released: June 19, 2007; Label: Ipecac (89); Format: CD	158	2	12	32	31	—
2013	Oddfellows: Released: January 29, 2013; Label: Ipecac	69	-	9	-	-	-
2021	Tonic Immobility: Released: March 26, 2021; Label: Ipecac						
"—" denotes a release that did not chart.

=== Singles ===
Year	Title	Album
2007	"Sun Dance"	Anonymous
2012	"Stone Letter"	Oddfellows
2014	"M.E.A.T."	Unreleased tracks from Oddfellows

=== Box sets ===
Year	Set details
2012	Eponymous To Anonymous: Released: April 21, 2012; Label: Ipecac (135); Format: 3XLP; Contains a 4th empty spot to receive the vinyl version of Oddfellows

=== Music videos ===
Year	Title	Album
2003	"Rape This Day"	Mit Gas
2012	"Stone Letter"	Oddfellows
2013	"Oddfellows"	Oddfellows

== With The Denison/Kimball Trio ==
=== Studio albums ===
Title	Album details
Walls in the City	Released: October 3, 1994 (US); Label: Skin Graft; Formats: CD, LP
Soul Machine	Released: April 17, 1995 (US); Label: Skin Graft; Formats: CD, LP
Neutrons	Released: August 12, 1997 (US); Label: Quarterstick; Formats: CD, LP

=== Singles ===
Year	Title	Album
1995	Landshark / Whirlpool	Non-album singles
1998	Sides 7-10 (Split release)	Non-album singles

== As a band member ==
Studio albums

Year	Month	Band	Release
1986	—	Cargo Cult	Strange Men Bearing Gifts
1993	Sep	Revolting Cocks	Linger Ficken' Good
1996	Oct	Firewater	Get Off the Cross, We Need the Wood for the Fire
2007	Sep	U.S.S.A.	The Spoils
2010	Apr	Legendary Shack Shakers	AgriDustrial
2011	—	Psych-Optic Trio	Cuts That Handicap
2013	Mar	The Unsemble	The Unsemble
2015	Sep	Legendary Shack Shakers	The Southern Surreal

== As session musician ==
Year	Artist	Release	Song(s)
1994	Pigface	Notes From Thee Underground	"Slut/Blood/Pain - The Attempted Restraint of the Cosmos"
1995	Sally Timms	To the Land of Milk and Honey	"It Says Here"
1998	Firewater	The Ponzi Scheme	"Knock 'Em Down", "Drunkard's Lament"
2004	Bobby Bare, Jr.'s Young Criminals Starvation League	From the End of Your Leash	—
2004	Bonnie "Prince" Billy	Sings Greatest Palace Music	"Riding"
2011	Hank Williams III	Hillbilly Joker	—
2005	Andrew Bird	The Mysterious Production of Eggs	"Opposite Day"
2005	Silver Jews	Tanglewood Numbers	—
2007	Beverley Knight	Music City Soul	Tracks 1–3, 5–11, 13–15
2013	EmptyMansions	snakes/vultures/sulfate	—
2016	Laura J. Martin	On the Never Never	—
2022	Jack White	Fear of the Dawn	"Morning, Noon and Night"
2024	Buñuel	Mansuetude	"American Steel"
