= List of silent musical compositions =

This is a list of musical works which consist mostly or entirely of silence.

== Theory ==
Some composers have discussed the significance of silence or a silent composition without ever composing such a work. In his 1907 manifesto, Sketch of a New Esthetic of Music, Ferruccio Busoni described its significance:

That which, within our present-day music, most nearly approaches the essential of the art, is the Rest and the Hold (Pause). Consummate players, improvisers, know how to employ these instruments of expression in loftier and ampler measure. The tense silence between two movements—in itself music, in this environment—leaves wider scope for divination than the more determinate, but therefore less elastic, sound.

After Paul Hindemith read this, he suggested a work consisting of nothing but pauses and fermatas in 1916.

== Classical compositions ==
A number of classical compositions consisting primarily of silence have been composed since 1896:

- Il Silenzio: pezzo caratteristico e descrittivo (stile moderno) (1896) by "Samuel", a pseudonym, probably Edgardo Del Valle de Paz; published in the Year 1. Vol. 1. Nº11. Supplement of the journal La Nuova Musica.

"Samuel was attempting a different means of writing one of his humorous critiques on musical society, mainly in Florence. All the techniques used are well developed and extremely diversified for a piece having no pitch and with a skill that only Erik Satie could match at that time. He highlights and questions every compositional cliché that was in vogue during the period among traditional Italian composers and the growth of modernist avant-garde arts, using humor as a mechanism of critique".

- Funeral March for the Obsequies of a Deaf Man (1897) by Alphonse Allais, a French writer and humorist (1854–1905); published in his Album primo-avrilesque.

Twenty-four blank measures. Earlier title: "Great sorrows are mute: incoherent funeral march". The composer instructed: "Great sorrows being mute, the performers should occupy themselves with the sole task of counting the bars, instead of indulging in the kind of indecent row that destroys the august character of the best obsequies."

- In futurum (1919), by Erwin Schulhoff (1894–1942).

Silent; notated in great rhythmic detail, employing bizarre time signatures and intricate rhythmic patterns.

- Silent music (1941), by Raymond Scott (1909–1994).

The band was going through all the motions: the swart, longish-haired leader led away; the brasses, the saxophones, the clarinets made a great show of fingering and blowing, but the only sound from the stage was a rhythmic swish-swish from the trap-drummer, a froggy slap-slap from the bull-fiddler, a soft plunk-plunk from the pianist.

- Monotone-Silence Symphony (1949), by Yves Klein.

In two movements; a single 20-minute sustained chord followed by a 20-minute silence.

- 4′33″ (1952), by John Cage (1912–1992).

Silent; in three movements lasting a total of four minutes and 33 seconds, for any instrument or combination of instruments.

- Three Bagatelles, for David Tudor (1961), by György Ligeti.
- 4′33″ No. 2 (1962), by John Cage.

Also known as 0'00"; the performer determines the extent to which the piece is silent, mostly silent, noisy, or raucous.

The composer instructed: "In a situation provided with maximum amplification, perform a disciplined action. The performer should allow any interruptions of the action, the action should fulfill an obligation to others, the same action should not be used in more than one performance, and should not be the performance of a musical composition."

- Fur Music (1971), by Nelson Howe.

Found on pages 295–297 of Source: Music of the Avant Garde magazine, issue no. 9. Performers/listeners are to rub their fingers against pieces of fur interpreting the texture of the fur as they may within their heads. This may often result in silence.

== Songs ==
- "Mute - By Maison Margiela" by Tommy Cash (2021)
- "12:97:24:99" by Mudvayne (2002)
- "15 Minutes" by Télépopmusik (2005)
- "18 sekúndur fyrir sólarupprás" (18 seconds before sunrise) by Sigur Rós (1997)
- "23 Seconds of Silence" by Wilco (1999)
- "30 Minutes of Silence" by M.I.A. on M.I.7 (2026)
- "4:20" by Brutal Truth on Sounds of the Animal Kingdom (1997)
- "42 Minutes of Silence" by Milosh on Quiet Time, with Milosh (2002)
- "9-11-01" by Soulfly (2002)
- "A big thank you to" and "Turn" by C418 on Bushes and Marshmallows (2009)
- "Absolute Elsewhere" by Coil
- "Ad Interim" by E.S.T on Leucocyte (2008)
- "A Moment of Silence" by The Neighbourhood (2015)
- "Anniversary Of World War III" by The West Coast Pop Art Experimental Band on Volume 3: A Child's Guide to Good and Evil (1968)
- "Are We Here? (Criminal Justice Bill? Mix)" by Orbital
- "The Ballad of Richard Nixon" by John Denver (1969)
- "Beware! The Funk is Everywhere" by Afrika Bambaataa (1986)
- "Birthdeath Experience" by Whitehouse (1980)
- "(Blank)" by The All-American Rejects
- "blank track" by The Jesus Lizard on deluxe remastered reissues of Liar (1992) and Down (1994) and "[silence]" on Goat (1991)
- "Brawthers" by Brawthers, 2019 (Just the guitar is silent)
- "BunaB #5" by Al Crowder
- "The Dog Whistle Song" by Bryant Oden, a song which apparently has inaudible lyrics (2012)
- "Drips" by Eminem is omitted from censored copies of his album The Eminem Show and the track is replaced with four seconds of silence.
- "Extract From The Compassion & Humanity Of Margaret Thatcher", on the Cherry Red Records compilation Pillows and Prayers 2 (1984)
- "Le Chant des carpes" by Ludwig von 88 on Houlala II "la mission" (1987)
- "Gestenstücke" by Juan María Solare, a collection of five pieces for 4 performers in which a musical structure is used to put order in non-sounding elements, concretely gestures. For instance, the first piece of the cycle is a canon of gestures. (2008)
- "Hawk's Call" by Yoko Ono on Take Me to the Land of Hell (2013)
- "I Predict Some Quiet" by the Kaiser Chiefs (2005)
- "In Remembrance" by Pan.Thy.Monium on Khaooohs and Kon-Fus-Ion (1996)
- "[intermission]" by Titus Andronicus (band) on The Most Lamentable Tragedy (2015)
- "Intentionally Left Blank" by James Holden (in The Idiots Are Winning (2006))
- "...less is more..." by Lawrence English (2020)
- "A Lot of Nothing" by Coheed and Cambria (Split into 11 sections ranging from 5–15 seconds in length)
- "Magic Window" by Boards of Canada on Geogaddi (2002)
- "The Misinterpretation of Silence and its Disastrous Consequences" by Type O Negative on Slow, Deep and Hard (1991)
- "The Most Important Track On the Album" by Astronautalis (2008)
- "(nothing)" by The Microphones
- "Nutopian International Anthem" by John Lennon on Mind Games (1973)
- "Omitted for Clarity" by Karnivool on Themata (2005)
- "One Minute of Silence" by Soundgarden
- "A One Minute Silence" by Mike Batt
- "Page 13" by Fantômas
- "Path XII Inlustra Nigror" by Vesania
- "Pause" by Rob Dougan
- "Piste Silencieuse" by Wax Tailor
- "Pregnant Pause... Intermission" by Leila Bela
- "Pure Digital Silence" by the Melvins
- "The Real Song for the Deaf" by Queens of the Stone Age on Songs for the Deaf (2002)
- "Room 0: Solo for Conductor" by Nits
- "Rwanda" by Radio Boy (2001).
- "Schweigeminute" by VNV Nation on Praise the Fallen (1999)
- "Silence" by Karl Bartos (2013)
- "(Silence)" by Ciccone Youth
- "[Silence]" by Korn
- "[Silence]" ("A suitable place for those with tired ears to pause and resume listening later") by Robert Wyatt
- "Silence" by Brian Eno on Drums Between the Bells (2011)
- "Silence" by Knife Party
- "Silence" by Denki Groove on 662 BPM by DG (1990)
- "Silencio sepulcral" (Sepulchral Silence) by Soziedad Alkoholika
- "Song of the Deaf Girl" by Cloud Cult on The Meaning of 8 (2007)
- "Štrajk" by Hladno pivo on Šamar (2003)
- "Tense Atmosphere", a graphic score by Juan María Solare which consists of a silence with a sforzato sign (2013)
- "The Sound of Free speech" by Crass
- "Tathagatagarbha" by Clarence Clarity on No Now (2015)
- "There's a Riot Goin' On" by Sly and the Family Stone
- "Thirty-second Silence" by Guster
- "The Ten Coolest Things About New Jersey" by The Bloodhound Gang
- "Track 3," accidentally released as a promotional single on Taylor Swift's album 1989. It consisted of eight seconds of white noise and topped the iTunes chart in Canada.
- "Tunnel of Goats XVII" by Coil
- "Two Minutes Silence" by John Lennon and Yoko Ono
- "You Can Make Your Own Music" by Covenant (a 4-minute and 33 second silent track, in reference to John Cage's composition 4′33")
- "Leave On" by Blackmail
- "Minut ćutanja" (Moment of silence) by Marčelo
- "Non Musical Silence" by The All-American Rejects
- "Silence" by Alva Noto on Unitxt
- "Weg" by Die Fantastischen Vier on Die 4. Dimension
- "Untitled" by Brainbombs on Brainbombs
- "Dramatic Pause Of Silence To Signify The End Of The Album And Beginning Of Additional Songs Included On The CD To Make People Feel Better About Buying The CD Instead Of The Vinyl Version" by Kid606 on Who Still Kill Sound?
- "nothing" by nothing on Scratchovision Song Contest 2049 (2019)

== Albums ==
- The Best Of Marcel Marceao, a 1970 MGM Records LP created by producer Michael Viner. Spoof album alleged to be a recording of a live performance of French mime Marcel Marceau.
- Rosemary Brown Psyches Again!, a 1982 Enharmonic Records LP by David DeBoor Canfield. Side one contains parodies of works supposedly taken down by British psychic Rosemary Brown from deceased composers. Side two is silent and contains an Introduction by Marcel Marceau and a "discussion" by Johann Sebastian Bach and Johannes Brahms on the musical merits of Rosemary Brown's efforts.
- Sleepify, a 2014 album by Vulfpeck consisting of 10 tracks of silence. The album was released on the music streaming service Spotify and generated $20,000 in royalties over a two-month period. It exposed a loophole in the streaming service's royalty calculation model.
- The TISM Omni-Album by TISM, a 100-minute album of silence released in 2020.
- The Wit and Wisdom of Ronald Reagan, a 1980 LP released by Magic Records, a sublabel of Stiff Records created specifically for releasing this LP, consisting of two 20 minute silent tracks, "The Wit of Ronald Reagan" and "The Wisdom of Ronald Reagan". The joke of the album was that somebody would buy it expecting to hear wit and wisdom from Ronald Reagan, only to hear silence as he didn't have any wit or wisdom. The album was never reissued; however, an extract from it appeared on the compilation "The Big Stiff Box Set".
- Is This What We Want?, a 2025 Virgin Music Group album credited to over a thousand UK artists, including Kate Bush, Damon Albarn and Annie Lennox. It was released as a protest against the use of unlicensed copyrighted work to train AI. The track titles form the sentence "The British government must not legalise music theft to benefit AI companies".

== See also ==
- Anti-art
- Empty book
