= Rack (album) =

Studio album by the Jesus Lizard
- Released: September 13, 2024
- Recorded: November 2023
- Studio: Audio Eagle Records, Nashville, Tennessee
- Genre: Noise rock
- Length: 36:44
- Label: Ipecac
- Producer: Paul Allen; The Jesus Lizard

The Jesus Lizard chronology
Bang (2000)	Rack (2024)

Singles from Rack
- 1. "Hide & Seek" Released: June 5, 2024; 2. "Alexis Feels Sick" Released: July 7, 2024; 3. "Moto(R)" Released: August 14, 2024

Rack is the seventh studio album by American rock band the Jesus Lizard, which was released on September 13, 2024, on Ipecac Recordings. It is the first studio release by the band in 26 years since Blue (1998). The record was praised by music critics upon release.

== Background ==
Following the release of the band's sixth studio album, Blue, the band broke up in June 1998. They would briefly reunite in 2009 for a tour, but would soon dissolve again. It wouldn't be till September 2017 that the band would re-unite permanently. While the rest of the band wanted to, lead vocalist David Yow was not committed to making another record, but upon hearing the demos the rest of the band sent to him, he was impressed and began to workshop vocals in 2019.

The album was announced on June 5, 2024, along with the release of the lead single and music video for "Hide & Seek" and tour dates spanning from June 2024 to May 2025. Yow would describe "Hide & Seek" as a "a perky ditty about a witch who can't behave, and it's got nearly as many hooks as a Mike Tyson fight." The second single "Alexis Feels Sick", written about Girls Against Boys drummer Alexis Fleisig, and third single "Moto(R)" would be released on July 7, 2024, and August 14, 2024, respectively alongside music videos.

== Recording ==
In an interview the band did for The New York Times, the band began working on the record in 2019 at Audio Eagle in Nashville, Tennessee with local producer and session guitarist Paul Allen. According to bassist David Wm. Sims, they chose to write a new record because "we thought it would be fun".

The only track on the record to have its origins in the nineties is "Lord Godiva", with everything else written within the past five years.

In a statement by guitarist Duane Denison on the musical direction of the record, "there are definitely some references to the past, but it's more as a point of departure: We don't stay there," Drummer Mac McNeilly also noted in a statement that "we are bonded by the music we make, and also by the respect we have for each other.", when talking about the making of the record.

== Reception ==
Professional ratings
Aggregate scores
Source	Rating
Metacritic	84/100
Review scores
Source	Rating
AllMusic	4/5 stars
Classic Rock	4.5/5 stars
Clash	9/10
Mojo	4/5 stars
PopMatters	8/10
The Quietus	favorable
Uncut	7/10
Under the Radar	8/10

According to music aggregation site Metacritic, the average rating is an 84/100 from 11 reviews, indicating "universal acclaim". Brian Stout of PopMatters believed that despite the long hiatus, the members "haven’t lost a step", specifically highlighting Yow's vocals and lyrics, describing them as "man possessed, howling his trademark demented but poetic tales", Sim's "rumbling" bass, and Denison's "inventive riffs". They also praised Allen's production work, stating that it "fits snugly between the raw, brute force of their work with Steve Albini and the punched-up sound of the group’s major label debut Shot". Overall, they stated that "Rack is another thrilling chapter of one of the most significant noise bands ever to do it. For the uninitiated, it will be instantly apparent why so many groups claim them as an influence."

Classic Rock's Emma Johnston also praised the record, giving it a rating of 4.5/5. They described it as a "fine balancing act of controlled noise and vocal bedlam", specific highlights were "Lord Godiva" and "Is That Your Hand?". In conclusion, Johnston states that 26 years later, "still no one can hold a candle to the Jesus Lizard". The Quietus also praised it, giving it album of the week. Concluding the review for AllMusic, Mark Deming called the album, "living, breathing, sweaty proof the Jesus Lizard can write songs and give them shape in the studio just as well as they ever did, and it honestly stands beside the best of their Touch & Go catalog in both spirit and execution. And they still hit like a crescent wrench to the face. Which is a compliment."

=== Year-end lists ===
Select year-end rankings for Rack
Publication	Accolade	Rank	Ref.
Pitchfork	The 30 Best Rock Albums of 2024	17	

== Track listing ==
All tracks are written by David L. Yow, Duane P. Denison, David William Sims and Carey McNeilly.

Rack track listing
No.	Title	Length
1.	"Hide & Seek"	3:04
2.	"Armistice Day"	4:26
3.	"Grind"	2:35
4.	"What If?"	3:45
5.	"Lord Godiva"	3:04
6.	"Alexis Feels Sick"	4:29
7.	"Falling Down"	3:25
8.	"Dunning Kruger"	2:33
9.	"Moto(R)"	2:50
10.	"Is That Your Hand?"	3:08
11.	"Swan the Dog"	3:25
Total length:		36:44

== Personnel ==
The Jesus Lizard

- Duane Denison – guitar, production
- Mac McNeilly – drums, production
- David Wm. Sims – bass guitar, production
- David Yow – vocals, production

Technical

- Paul Allen – production, engineering, assistant mixing engineer
- Mark Lonsway – mixing engineer, assistant engineer
- Howie Weinberg – mastering
- Morgan Stratton – assistant engineer
- Alex Altman – studio assistant

Visuals

- Malcolm Bucknall – front cover painting (The Witch and Her Apprentice), back cover painting (The Girl Next Door)

== Charts ==
Chart performance for Rack
Chart (2024)	Peak position
Croatian International Albums (HDU)	13
Scottish Albums (OCC)	18
UK Album Downloads (OCC)	25
UK Independent Albums (OCC)	7
