= Laughing Hyenas =

Michigan rock group active 1985–1995

Background information
- Origin: Ann Arbor, Michigan, U.S.
- Genres: Garage rock, hardcore punk, punk blues, post-hardcore, garage punk, noise rock
- Years active: 1985–1995
- Labels: Touch and Go, Third Man
- Past members: John Brannon; Jim Kimball; Kevin Strickland; Larissa Strickland; Todd Swalla; Kevin Ries; Ron Sakowski; Mike Danner

Laughing Hyenas was an American noise rock band from Ann Arbor, Michigan, that existed from 1985 to 1995, fronted by Negative Approach vocalist John Brannon. Music journalist Steve Huey wrote of the band retrospectively, "At first, the band specialized in dirges overlaid with the tortuous, throat-shredding vocals of frontman John Brannon. As time passed, their blues connections became more and more explicit". Though they played with many of the era's most notable acts, including Mudhoney, Dinosaur Jr., and Sonic Youth the band failed to achieve any level of commercial success, breaking up in the mid-1990s due to personal issues.

== History ==
Despite the fact that Laughing Hyenas formed in late 1984 in Ann Arbor, Michigan, founding member John Brannon has alleged that the inspiration for the band came after he and Larissa Stolarchuk, vocalist for the band L-Seven, saw The Birthday Party perform in Detroit in March 1983. Stolarchuk and Brannon, who were a couple, were each experiencing their separate bands breaking up and were already plotting their next move. The pair relocated from Detroit to Ann Arbor in 1984 and formed the nucleus of Laughing Hyenas. The original lineup consisted of vocalist John Brannon, guitarist Larissa Stolarchuk, drummer Mike Danner and bassist Kevin Monroe, with Monroe and Stolarchuk later changing their last names to Strickland. The band's first show was in Ann Arbor opening for Destroy All Monsters in April 1985.

After polishing their songs for roughly a year, they recorded a self-released demo in 1986 of the material which ended up on their first EP. Prior to recording it, Danner left the group, becoming the drummer for Big Chief, and was replaced by Jim Kimball. Their debut EP, Come Down to the Merry Go Round, was released in 1987 on Touch and Go Records. Notably, the band produced the album with a then-relatively small producer named Butch Vig at Smart Studios in Madison, Wisconsin. The Laughing Hyenas' work with Vig inspired Nirvana to work with the engineer on some of their records, including Nevermind. In November 1987, the band performed live on WCBN-FM, playing much of the material from the new album as well as many of the songs which ended up on their next album.

Prior to performing with Sonic Youth on some dates of their American tour in 1988, Laughing Hyenas recorded their first album, You Can't Pray a Lie, returning again to work with Butch Vig. Touch and Go released the album a year later in 1989 after which they did a brief European tour with label mates Killdozer . Their next album, Life of Crime came out in 1990 and was additionally produced by Vig. That year, the band again accompanied Sonic Youth on a leg of their American tour in support of Goo.

Around 1990, internal frictions in the band began to come to head. Prior to a short East Coast tour with the band Wig, during which future Kranky Records founder Bruce Adams served as their roadie, Monroe and Kimball began to regularly play music on the side with Wig's vocalist Preston Cleveland, later known as P.W. Long. With Long on guitar, Laughing Hyenas recorded an Alice Cooper composition for the Sub Pop singles club tribute to Cooper - the song "Public Animal #9.". Laughing Hyenas also performed the song live with Long onstage at CBGB on the end of the tour. Long, Kimball, and Monroe played their first show together as Mule, in the spring of 1991. Though referred to initially as a side-project, by the end of the year all three would leave their respective bands to play with Mule permanently.

Former Necros drummer Todd Swalla and bassist Kevin Ries were brought in to replace the rhythm section in 1992, with both members appearing on the Crawl EP. The band recorded the tracks at White Room Studios in Detroit with Al Sutton. Ries left before Crawl was released, due to personal issues, dying just a short time later. Just before Crawl came out, Ries was replaced by Necros bassist Ron Sakowski.

After playing the band's older material for about a year, they began to write and perform the songs for their third album, Hard Times. For this record, the band chose to work with Doug Easley and Dan McCain at Easley McCain Recording. The album was released in January 1995 with the band breaking up later that year.

=== Post-breakup ===
Shortly after the end of Laughing Hyenas, Brannon and former Gravitar guitarist Harold Richardson formed the band Easy Action with bassist Ron Sakowski in 1996. Though the band has seen various drummers throughout its incarnation, the band continues to perform regularly as of 2023. In September 2006, when a reunited Negative Approach played at Touch and Go's 25th Anniversary Block Party in Chicago, Brannon chose to play the set with Richardson and Sakowski rather than original members Rob and Graham McCulloch. Brannon has since continued to opt to perform with Richardson and Sakowski as Negative Approach continues to tour the world, over fifteen years after their reunion performance in Chicago.

Laughing Hyenas guitarist Larissa Strickland died on October 3, 2006, at the age of 46, in North Port, Florida. Strickland was ranked at number 181 on the 2023 revision of Rolling Stone's 250 greatest guitarist of all time list.

Monroe continued playing with Mule until they broke up in 1996, Kimball having left the band several years earlier. Kimball's departure from the band culminated in his forming The Denison/Kimball Trio (actually a duo) with Jesus Lizard guitarist, Duane Denison. Kimball additionally hooked up in this period with Australian experimental musician JG Thirlwell and became a member of his side-project Foetus. In 1996, Kimball briefly became the drummer for the Jesus Lizard, performing with them and playing on their self-titled EP and the album Blue. Kimball remained an active drummer with the Chicago-based band Ghost Forest through 2025; he died in August of that year at the age of 59.

Swalla went on to drum in the Toledo-based shoegaze band Streamlined who released a self-titled CD in 2001. He additionally went on to drum with blues-rock outfit Boogaloosa Prayer, performing on several of their albums.

In 2018, Detroit-based label Third Man Records re-released Laughing Hyenas' entire catalog on vinyl, adding bonus material to the reissued releases.

== Former members ==
- John Brannon – vocals (1984–1995)
- Larissa Strickland (Larissa Stolarchuk) – guitar (1984–1995)
- Jim Kimball – drums (1986–1991)
- Kevin Strickland (Kevin Monroe) – bass guitar (1984–1991)
- Ron Sakowski – bass guitar (1992–1995)
- Kevin Ries – bass guitar (1992)
- Todd Swalla – drums (1992–1995)

== Discography ==
=== Studio albums ===
- You Can't Pray a Lie (March 1989, Touch and Go Records) [Re-released Third Man Records 2018]
- Life of Crime (September 1990, Touch and Go Records) [Re-released Third Man Records 2018]
- Hard Times (January 1995, Touch and Go Records) [Re-released Third Man Records 2018]

=== Singles and EPs ===
- Stain demo cassette/EP (1986, self-released)
- Come Down to the Merry Go Round EP (November 1987, Touch and Go Records) [Re-released Third Man Records 2018]
- Candy (1988, Bob Magazine flexi-disc)
- Here We Go Again 7" EP (August 1990, Touch and Go Records)
- Crawl EP (October 19, 1992, Touch and Go Records) [Re-released Third Man Records on the Hard Times LP in 2018]
- Covers: Stolen Tapes 92 to 94 double-7" (1995, self-released)

=== Compilation albums ===
- Life of Crime/You Can't Pray a Lie (1990, Touch and Go Records)

=== Compilation appearances ===
- "Dedications to the One I Love (Live)" on Howl 7 EP (1990, Howl)
- "Public Animal #9" (Alice Cooper cover) on Alice Cooper Tribute EP (1991, Sub Pop Records)
- "Candy" on Mesomorph Enduros (1992, Big Cat)
- "Solid Gold Hell" (The Scientists cover) on Set It on Fire! (1993, Dog Meat)
- "Shine" on Jabberjaw...Pure Sweet Hell (1996, Mammoth Records)
- "Just Can't Win" on American Pie 2 (1996, Rubber Records)
