= Mouth Breather =

Single by The Jesus Lizard

from the album Goat
- B-side: "Sunday You Need Love"
- Released: December 15, 1990
- Recorded: September 1990
- Genre: Noise rock; post-hardcore
- Length: 2:15
- Label: Touch and Go
- Songwriter(s): Duane Denison, Mac McNeilly, David Wm. Sims, David Yow

The Jesus Lizard singles chronology
"Mouth Breather" (1990)	"Puss" (1993)

"Mouth Breather" is a 1990 song by American rock band The Jesus Lizard from the album Goat. It was revealed in the documentary Breadcrumb Trail that the song was inspired by Steve Albini's opinion of Slint drummer Britt Walford, after Walford had house sat for him.

== Track listing ==
1. "Mouth Breather" (Denison, McNeilly, Sims, Yow)
2. "Sunday You Need Love" (Krawinkel, Remmler)

== Accolades ==
Year	Publication	Country	Article	Rank
2004	Kerrang!	United Kingdom	666 Songs You Must Own: The Ultimate Playlist	18
2008	Pitchfork	United States	The Pitchfork 500	*
2010	Pitchfork	United States	Top 200 (+ 400 "See Also") Tracks of the 1990s	123

(*) designates unordered lists.

== Personnel ==
- David Yow – vocals
- Duane Denison – guitar
- David Wm. Sims – bass
- Mac McNeilly – drums
