= Jesus Lizard =

Jesus Lizard may refer to:

- Jesus lizard (animal), a species of lizard
- The Jesus Lizard, an American rock band
  - The Jesus Lizard (EP), a 1998 EP by the band
- "The Jesus Lizard", a song by Snowbread from the 2006 album Age of Reptiles
- Jesús Luzardo, an MLB pitcher given the nickname by analyst Pitching Ninja
