= Crawl (Laughing Hyenas EP) =

EP by Laughing Hyenas
- Released: 1992
- Recorded: June 1992
- Studio: White Room, Detroit, MI
- Genre: Garage rock, punk blues
- Length: 18:22
- Label: Touch and Go
- Producer: Laughing Hyenas, Al Sutton

Laughing Hyenas chronology
Life of Crime (1990)	Crawl (1992)	Hard Times (1995)

Crawl is an EP by American garage rock band Laughing Hyenas, released in 1992 by Touch and Go Records.

== Recording ==
After original members Kevin Strickland and Jim Kimball departed from the band to form Mule, they were replaced by Kevin Ries, a fan from Cleveland, and Todd Swalla, former drummer of Necros.

== Reception ==
Professional ratings
Review scores
Source	Rating
AllMusic	4.5/5 stars

AllMusic critic Mark Deming criticized the album for showing the band "in the midst of a rebuilding year" and noted that "they weren't playing badly, but it would be a little while before the new lineup was fully up to speed".

== Track listing ==
All tracks are written by Laughing Hyenas.

No.	Title	Length
1.	"Crawl"	5:14
2.	"Living in Darkness"	3:43
3.	"Walk"	4:24
4.	"Girl"	5:01

== Personnel ==
Adapted from the Crawl liner notes.

Laughing Hyenas

- John Brannon – lead vocals
- Kevin Ries – bass guitar
- Larissa Strickland – guitar
- Todd Swalla – drums

Production and additional personnel

- Laughing Hyenas – production
- Al Sutton – production, engineering
- Bill Widener – cover art

== Release history ==
Region	Date	Label	Format	Catalog
United States	1992	Touch and Go	CD, CS, LP	TG102
