= Bang (The Jesus Lizard album) =

Compilation album by The Jesus Lizard
- Released: January 18, 2000
- Recorded: August 1, 1989–March 25, 1999
- Genre: Noise rock
- Label: Touch and Go Records

The Jesus Lizard chronology
Blue (1998)	Bang (2000)	Rack (2024)

Professional ratings
Review scores
Source	Rating
AllMusic	3/5 stars
Alternative Press	4/5 stars
Kerrang!	4/5 stars
NME	4/5 stars
Pitchfork	7.3/10
Q	3/5 stars

Bang is a compilation album by The Jesus Lizard, containing tracks previously released on EPs and singles, and some unreleased songs.

== Track listing ==
All tracks by The Jesus Lizard, except where noted.

1. "Chrome" (Chrome) – 3:51
2. "7 Vs. 8" – 3:33
3. "Gladiator" – 4:03
4. "Seasick" – 3:15
5. "Wheelchair Epidemic" (The Dicks) – 2:11
6. "Dancing Naked Ladies" – 3:01
7. "Mouth Breather" – 2:15
8. "Sunday You Need Love" (Trio) – 2:44
9. "Glamorous" – 3:03
10. "Deaf as a Bat" – 1:38
11. "Lady Shoes" – 2:37
12. "Killer McHann" – 2:10
13. "Bloody Mary" – 2:40
14. "Monkey Trick" – 4:36
15. "Uncommonly Good" – 2:48
16. "The Test" – 2:36
17. "Blockbuster" – 3:32
18. "Fly on the Wall" – 2:54
19. "White Hole" – 3:22
20. "Anna" (Trio) – 2:38
