= Life of Crime =

Life of Crime may refer to:

- Life of Crime (album), a 1990 album by Laughing Hyenas
- Life of Crime (TV series), a 2013 British television police procedural
- Life of Crime (film), a 2013 crime comedy-drama, starring Jennifer Aniston
- "Life of Crime", an episode of SpongeBob SquarePants
- Kingpin: Life of Crime, a 1999 first-person action video game developed by Xatrix Entertainment
- Career criminals
