= Kings County Queens =

- Origin: Brooklyn, New York
- Genres: Country music
- Years active: 2000–present
- Labels: Rubric Records
- Members: Daria Klotz, Chris Bowers, Suzanne Price, Eric Eble, Johnny Rock
- Past members: David Wm. Sims

Kings County Queens are a Brooklyn-based country music band known for their authentic, Nashville-like sound. The band was formed in early 2000, and their debut album, Big Ideas, was released by Rubric Records on May 7, 2002. Its original lineup consisted of Suzanne Price (accordion), Chris Bowers (vocals, guitar), Daria Klotz (vocals, baritone ukulele), Rennie Elliot (snare drums), and David Wm. Sims (bass guitar). Elliot and Sims later left the band to pursue other projects, after which they were replaced by Johnny Rock and Eric Eble, respectively.

== Reviews ==
Country Standard Time's Clarissa Sansone wrote that Big Ideas "...tips its hat to the city with its sometimes streetwise lyrics, but overall the sound is old-fashioned: a ukulele tune on a moonlit boat ride flavored with rockabilly riffs." Writing for the Village Voice, Robert Christgau gave the album a one-star honorable mention rating, writing, "Beneath their warm country-folk exterior lurks bitter urban-folk experience". AllMusic's Rick Anderson gave the album 4 out of 5 stars, writing that "Kings County Queens are urbanites, all right, but the love they bring to this repertoire feels sincere, their stylistic command is genuine, and, most importantly, the music they make is lots of fun."

== Discography ==
- Big Ideas (Rubric, 2002)
