= Come Down to the Merry Go Round =

EP by Laughing Hyenas
- Released: November 1987
- Recorded: September 1987
- Studio: Smart Studios, Madison, WI
- Genre: Garage rock; noise rock; post-hardcore; art rock
- Length: 26:23
- Label: Touch and Go
- Producer: Laughing Hyenas, Butch Vig

Laughing Hyenas chronology
Come Down to the Merry Go Round (1987)	You Can't Pray a Lie (1989)

Professional ratings
Review scores
Source	Rating
AllMusic	4/5 stars

Come Down to the Merry Go Round is an EP by garage rock band Laughing Hyenas. It was released in 1987 on Touch and Go Records. It was reissued in 1995 accompanied with five bonus tracks.

Chuck Eddy ranked it at number 454 in his 1991 book of the best 'heavy metal' albums.

== Track listing ==
All tracks are written by Laughing Hyenas.

Side one
No.	Title	Length
1.	"Stain"	4:16
2.	"Hell's Kitchen"	3:19
3.	"That Girl"	5:17

Side two
No.	Title	Length
1.	"Gabriel"	4:09
2.	"Playground"	4:32
3.	"What Tomorrow Brings"	4:48
4.	"Soul Kiss" (cassette bonus track)	6:39

1995 CD bonus tracks
No.	Title	Writer(s)	Length
8.	"Candy"		2:45
9.	"Dedications to the One I Love" (live)		6:08
10.	"Don't Bogue My High"		3:37
11.	"Public Animal #9" (Alice Cooper cover)	Cooper, Bruce	5:19

== Personnel ==
Adapted from the Come Down to the Merry Go Round liner notes.

Laughing Hyenas

- John Brannon – lead vocals, trumpet
- Jim Kimball – drums
- Kevin Strickland – bass guitar
- Larissa Strickland – guitar

Production and additional personnel

- Tim Caldwell – design
- Laughing Hyenas – production
- Rick Lieder – photography
- Butch Vig – production, engineering, recording

== Release history ==
Region	Date	Label	Format	Catalog
United States	1987	Touch and Go	CS, LP	TG12
United States	1995	Touch and Go	CD	TG12
