= Mule (band) =

American punk blues band

Mule was an American punk blues band from Michigan, active in the early 1990s. Formed by former members of Wig and Laughing Hyenas, their music incorporated elements of hardcore punk, blues-rock, and country music.

== History ==
Mule formed in Ann Arbor, Michigan, in 1991, anchored by former Wig member P.W. Long. The band's other members, Kevin Monroe and Jim Kimball, had been members of the Laughing Hyenas. This lineup recorded the band's self-titled debut, which was produced by Steve Albini and released on Chicago record label Quarterstick Records, itself a division of indie super label Touch and Go.

Kimball left the group in 1994 to join The Denison/Kimball Trio, and Daniel Jacob Wilson joined the group for their follow-up releases. If I Don't Six followed in 1994.

Mule self produced and released two singles on Detroit's independent Nocturnal Records. The first was "Tennessee Hustler", backed by "Black Bottom". The second was the "I'm Hell" single backed by a cover of the Bee Gees hit song "To Love Somebody". Next up was "Charger" from the Jabberjaw compilation.

Long split the band up in 1996 to go solo. He formed P.W. Long's Reelfoot in 1997 with Mac McNeilly from The Jesus Lizard and Dan Maister of Detroit band Bogue.

== Members ==
- P.W. Long – guitar, vocals
- Kevin Monroe – bass
- Jim Kimball – drums (1991–1994)
- Daniel Jacob Wilson – drums (1994–1995)
- Jason Kourkounis – drums (1995–1996)

== Discography ==
- 1992 – "Tennessee Hustler" / "Black Bottom" – 7-inch, Nocturnal Records
- 1992 – "I'm Hell" / "To Love Somebody" – 7-inch, Quarterstick Records
- 1993 – Mule – LP/CD/CS, Quarterstick Records
- 1994 – Wrung – 12-inch EP/CD/CS, Quarterstick Records
- 1994 – If I Don't Six – LP/CD/CS, Quarterstick Records
- 1997 – "Soul Sound" – a split 7-inch w/ Shellac, Laff & Go Records

Also appeared on:

- 1993 – Dead End Destiny Compilation Tennessee Hustler
- 1994 – Jabberjaw – "Good to the Last Drop" (CD compilation) Charger Mammoth Records
- 1996 – Metallurgy2 – "Reasons To Be Fearful" (CD comp) Charger Hard Stuff Division
- 2006 – Sweet Fifteen – "1991 To 2006 Mississippi Breaks" Rough Trade Records
