= Show (The Jesus Lizard album) =

Live album by the Jesus Lizard
- Released: 1994
- Recorded: December 19, 1993
- Genre: Noise rock
- Label: Collision Arts, Giant

The Jesus Lizard chronology
Lash (1993)	Show (1994)	Down (1994)

Professional ratings
Review scores
Source	Rating
AllMusic	2/5 stars
Entertainment Weekly	B−
Rolling Stone	3/5 stars

Show is a live album by the Chicago noise rock band the Jesus Lizard. It was recorded at CBGB's in New York City. It was a joint release by Collision Arts and Warner Bros. subsidiary label Giant Records. A video was released for the song "Glamorous" and was featured in an episode of Beavis and Butthead, where the teenage duo liked it.

== Track listing ==
1. "Glamorous" - 3:19
2. "Deaf as a Bat" - 1:42
3. "Seasick" - 3:14
4. "Bloody Mary" - 2:11
5. "Mistletoe" - 1:57
6. "Nub" - 2:58
7. "Elegy" - 4:01
8. "Killer McHann" - 2:59
9. "Dancing Naked Ladies" - 2:59
10. "Fly on the Wall" - 3:00
11. "Boilermaker" - 2:15
12. "Puss" - 3:08
13. "Gladiator" - 3:50
14. "Wheelchair Epidemic" - 2:10 (The Dicks)
15. "Monkey Trick" - 4:12
