= Goat (album) =

Studio album by the Jesus Lizard
- Released: March 15, 1991
- Recorded: September 1990
- Genres: Noise rock; post-hardcore
- Length: 30:24
- Label: Touch and Go
- Producer: Steve Albini

The Jesus Lizard chronology
Head (1990)	Goat (1991)	Liar (1992)

Goat is the second studio album by the Jesus Lizard, released in 1991. The album was produced by Steve Albini.

Its cover art, by bassist David Wm. Sims, at first glance resembles a flame, but is actually a topless woman with a close-up image of nails projected onto her body. The rear of the album, and several panels of the enclosed CD booklet include similar pictures of the same naked woman, with different images projected onto her body.

== Critical reception ==
Professional ratings
Review scores
Source	Rating
AllMusic	4.5/5 stars
The Austin Chronicle	4/5 stars
Beats Per Minute	93%
Paste	94/100
Pitchfork	9.3/10
The Rolling Stone Album Guide	2.5/5 stars
Select	3/5
Spin	8/10
Spin Alternative Record Guide	6/10
Tiny Mix Tapes	5/5

In 2003, Goat was ranked as the 38th best album of the 1990s by the online magazine Pitchfork.

== Legacy ==
The album's cover was referenced in the artwork for the 2007 single "Jesus Christ" by Brand New.

== Track listing ==
All tracks are written by the Jesus Lizard.

No.	Title	Length
1.	"Then Comes Dudley"	4:23
2.	"Mouth Breather"	2:17
3.	"Nub"	2:30
4.	"Seasick"	3:11
5.	"Monkey Trick"	4:19
6.	"Karpis"	3:10
7.	"South Mouth"	3:03
8.	"Lady Shoes"	2:42
9.	"Rodeo in Joliet"	4:49

Deluxe Remastered Reissue
No.	Title	Length
10.	"[silence]"	0:09
11.	"Sunday You Need Love"	2:45
12.	"Pop Song"	2:15
13.	"Seasick" (live)	3:05
14.	"Lady Shoes" (live)	2:37
15.	"Monkey Trick" (live)	4:32

== Personnel ==
- David Yow – vocals
- Duane Denison – guitar
- David Wm. Sims – bass
- Mac McNeilly – drums
