= Soul Machine (album) =

Studio album by The Denison/Kimball Trio
- Released: April 17, 1995
- Recorded: Idful, Chicago, Illinois
- Genre: Post-rock, avant-garde jazz
- Length: 37:05
- Label: Skin Graft
- Producer: Duane Denison, Jim Kimball

DK3 chronology
Walls in the City (1994)	Soul Machine (1995)	Neutrons (1997)

Professional ratings
Review scores
Source	Rating
NME	(7/10)

Soul Machine is the debut studio album of The Denison/Kimball Trio, released on April 17, 1995 by Skin Graft Records.

== Track listing ==
All music is composed by Duane Denison and Jim Kimball, except "Lonely Woman" by Ornette Coleman.

No.	Title	Length
1.	"Terminal 2"	3:50
2.	"Soul Machine"	3:16
3.	"Ad Infinitum"	3:25
4.	"Lonely Woman"	4:04
5.	"Factory Loop"	4:46
6.	"Framed"	2:18
7.	"Passing Blue"	3:19
8.	"Blueball Avenue"	5:02
9.	"Trans - Mission"	4:03
10.	"Solitaire"	3:02

== Personnel ==
Adapted from Soul Machine liner notes.

- Duane Denison – electric guitar
- Jim Kimball – drums, brushes, bongos

Additional musicians

- Reg Schrader – bass guitar (5)
- David Wm. Sims – keyboards (2)
- Ken Vandermark – saxophone (8)

Production and additional personnel

- The Denison/Kimball Trio – production
- Mark Fischer – design
- Brad Miller – photography
- Casey Rice – recording

== Release history ==
Region	Date	Label	Format	Catalog
United States	1995	Skin Graft	CD, LP	GR 22
