= You Can't Pray a Lie =

Studio album by Laughing Hyenas
- Released: March 1989
- Recorded: October 1988
- Studios: Smart, Madison, WI
- Genres: Punk, grunge
- Length: 31:13
- Label: Touch and Go
- Producers: Laughing Hyenas, Butch Vig

Laughing Hyenas chronology
Come Down to the Merry Go Round (1987)	You Can't Pray a Lie (1989)	Life of Crime (1990)

You Can't Pray a Lie is the debut studio album of American garage rock band Laughing Hyenas. It was released in 1989 by Touch and Go Records. It was reissued in 1992 accompanied with Life of Crime.

== Critical reception ==
Professional ratings
Review scores
Source	Rating
AllMusic	4/5 stars
MusicHound Rock: The Essential Album Guide	4/5 stars

Trouser Press praised Larissa Strickland's guitar playing. MusicHound Rock: The Essential Album Guide called the album "a perfect coalescing of the violence of punk and the guitar stomp of the coming grunge sound." Andrew Earles, in Gimme Indie Rock: 500 Essential American Underground Rock Albums 1981-1996, wrote that "many albums throughout rock-and-roll's history could carry the additional signifier 'hard-living set to music,' but few are as convincing as the albums made by Laughing Hyenas."

== Track listing ==
All tracks are written by Laughing Hyenas.

Side one
No.	Title	Length
1.	"Love's My Only Crime"	3:20
2.	"Seven Come Eleven"	2:18
3.	"Black Eyed Susan"	2:40
4.	"Lullaby and Goodnight"	4:43

Side two
No.	Title	Length
1.	"Sister"	4:20
2.	"Desolate Son"	4:41
3.	"Dedications to the One I Love"	4:42
4.	"New Gospel"	4:25

== Personnel ==
Adapted from the You Can't Pray a Lie liner notes.

Laughing Hyenas

- John Brannon – lead vocals, trumpet
- Jim Kimball – drums
- Kevin Strickland – bass guitar
- Larissa Strickland – guitar

Production and additional personnel

- Laughing Hyenas – production
- Butch Vig – production, engineering, recording

== Release history ==
Region	Date	Label	Format	Catalog
United States	1989	Touch and Go	LP	TG38
