= Head (The Jesus Lizard album) =

1990 studio album by The Jesus Lizard

Studio album by the Jesus Lizard
- Released: 1990
- Genre: Indie rock
- Length: 27:21
- Label: Touch and Go
- Producer: Steve Albini

The Jesus Lizard chronology
| Pure (1989) | Head (1990) | Goat (1991) |

Head is the debut studio album by the American band the Jesus Lizard. It was released on Touch and Go Records in 1990. It was their first release to feature a drummer, Mac McNeilly.

== Critical reception ==
Professional ratings
Review scores
| Source | Rating |
|---|---|
| AllMusic | 4/5 stars |
| Beats Per Minute | 76% |
| The Encyclopedia of Popular Music | 3/5 stars |
| OndaRock | 8/10 |
| Paste | 75/100 |
| Pitchfork | 8.1/10 |
| The Rolling Stone Album Guide | 2.5/5 stars |
| Spectrum Culture | 4.5/5 |
| Spin Alternative Record Guide | 5/10 |

The Windsor Star determined that "the droning vocals and sound effects produce some mesmerizing results." Trouser Press noted that McNeilly's "self-possessed demeanor is reminiscent of Charlie Watts at his most implacable."

== Track listing ==
1. "One Evening" – 3:01
2. "S.D.B.J." – 2:27
3. "My Own Urine" – 3:08
4. "If You Had Lips" – 3:13
5. "7 vs. 8" – 3:35
6. "Pastoral" – 3:29
7. "Waxeater" – 2:09
8. "Good Thing" – 1:44
9. "Tight n' Shiny" – 2:11
10. "Killer McHann" – 2:16

CD version includes the Pure EP (1989):

11. "Blockbuster" – 3:29
12. "Bloody Mary" – 1:59
13. "Rabid Pigs" – 2:09
14. "Starlet" – 2:42
15. "Happy Bunny Goes Fluff-Fluff Along" ("Breaking Up Is Hard to Do") – 3:54

== Personnel ==
- David Yow – lead vocals (all but 11)
- Duane Denison – guitars
- David Wm. Sims – bass, lead vocals (11)
- Mac McNeilly – drums (1–10)

Additional personnel

- Suzy Korn – backing vocals (2)
- The Manger Mens Choir – backing vocals (7)
