= Down (The Jesus Lizard album) =

Studio album by the Jesus Lizard
- Released: August 30, 1994
- Recorded: Early–mid 1994
- Genre: Noise rock
- Length: 40:40
- Label: Touch and Go Records
- Producer: Steve Albini

The Jesus Lizard chronology
Show (1994)	Down (1994)	Shot (1996)

Professional ratings
Review scores
Source	Rating
AllMusic	3/5 stars
Beats Per Minute	65%
Encyclopedia of Popular Music	3/5 stars
NME	4/5 stars
OndaRock	7/10
Pitchfork	7.9/10
Q	3/5 stars
Rolling Stone	4/5 stars
The Rolling Stone Album Guide	3.5/5 stars
Spectrum Culture	4.5/5

Down is an album by the Chicago band the Jesus Lizard. It was their last album for Touch and Go records and the last to be produced by Steve Albini.

The song "Horse" was labeled as "Pony Beat" on set lists for live shows. David Wm. Sims plays an organ on the album version.

A video was created for the song "Destroy Before Reading," featuring David Yow as simply a head in a laboratory.

The painting on the cover is "Falling Dog" by Malcolm Bucknall, for which Bucknall asked no pay and offers no explanation. Bucknall also did the cover art for the Puss/Oh, the Guilt split single with Nirvana and the Jesus Lizard's Liar album.

== Track listing ==
All tracks are written by The Jesus Lizard, except where noted.

No.	Title	Length
1.	"Fly on the Wall"	3:06
2.	"Mistletoe"	1:53
3.	"Countless Backs of Sad Losers"	3:00
4.	"Queen for a Day"	2:26
5.	"The Associate"	5:00
6.	"Destroy Before Reading" (Lyrics by Whitney O'Keeffe)	3:13
7.	"Low Rider"	3:36
8.	"50 Cents"	2:49
9.	"American BB"	2:18
10.	"Horse"	3:10
11.	"Din"	3:19
12.	"Elegy"	3:48
13.	"The Best Parts" (Lyrics by Mark Todd)	2:55

Deluxe Remastered Reissue
No.	Title	Length
14.	"blank track"	0:09
15.	"White Hole"	3:21
16.	"Glamorous"	3:06
17.	"Deaf as a Bat"	1:39
18.	"Panic in Cicero"	3:28

== Chart performance ==
Chart (1994)	Peak position
Scottish Albums (Official Charts)	97
UK Albums (Official Charts)	64
