= A Sinister Alphabet =

Studio album by Phantom 309
- Released: August 17, 1989
- Recorded: Autumn 1988
- Studio: Studio 805 (Nashville, TN)
- Genre: Noise rock, garage punk, punk blues
- Length: 21:37
- Label: Tupelo
- Producer: Jon Langford

A Sinister Alphabet is the only studio album of Phantom 309, released in 1989 by Tupelo Recording Company.

== Reception ==
Ira Robbins of Trouser Press wrote an enthusiastic review, saying it "simmers with backwoods weirdness and domineering intensity" and calling it "a dish of gutter-level grungeabilly and cohesively crude rock noise distinguished by guitarist John Forbes' devilish growl."

== Track listing ==
All tracks are written by Phantom 309, except "Tiger in Your Tank" by Willie Dixon.

Side one
No.	Title	Length
1.	"Tiger in Your Tank"	3:12
2.	"Burn Sweet Bright"	2:22
3.	"Beaver Hollow Turnaround"	2:30
4.	"Slowboat to China"	2:46

Side two
No.	Title	Length
1.	"Sweating Like a Nail"	2:20
2.	"Lil' Masturbator"	0:33
3.	"Ah So, What Else"	1:44
4.	"Janitor to the Stars"	2:54
5.	"Not Your Style"	3:11

== Personnel ==
Adapted from the A Sinister Alphabet liner notes.

Phantom 309

- John Forbes – vocals, electric guitar
- Gary Held – drums
- Mac McNeilly – bass guitar

Production and design

- Ian Caple – mixing
- Dean Clyne – assistant engineer
- Jon Langford – production, mixing
- Edward Gorey – cover art, illustrations
- Dan Vaganek – engineering

== Release history ==
Region	Date	Label	Format	Catalog
United Kingdom	1989	Tupelo	CD, LP	TUP3
