= Phantom 309 (band) =

American noise rock band

- Origin: Atlanta, Georgia, U.S.
- Genres: Noise rock, garage punk, garage rock, punk blues
- Years active: 1988–1989
- Label: Tupelo
- Past members: John Forbes; Gary Held; Mac McNeilly

Phantom 309 was an American noise rock band formed in Atlanta by Gary Held, John Forbes and Mac McNeilly. They existed for a brief amount of time and recorded one full-length album, titled A Sinister Alphabet, in 1989.

== History ==
Phantom 309 was founded in 1988 and issued their debut album, titled A Sinister Alphabet in 1989 on Tupelo Recording Company. It was produced by Jon Langford, known for his work with Mekons, Three Johns and The Waco Brothers, and featured artwork by renowned illustrator Edward Gorey, who allowed the band access to his work for $400. The group disbanded when Mac McNeilly moved to Chicago to play drums for The Jesus Lizard in 1989.

== Discography ==
- A Sinister Alphabet (Tupelo, 1989)
