= Tiger Bell =

Swedish band

- Tiger Bell performing in Paris on November 5, 2013

Background information
- Origin: Stockholm, Luleå, Sweden
- Genres: Punk rock, Cheerleader punk
- Years active: 2010–present
- Label: Platinum Records / WIFE / Sony
- Members: Lovisa Thurfjell; Canan Rosén; Lisa Löfgren; Lotta Wennström
- Website: www.tigerbell.com

Tiger Bell is a punk rock band from Luleå, based in Stockholm, Sweden formed in September 2010 by Lovisa Thurfjell (lead vocals/rhythm guitar), Canan Rosén (bass/backup vocals), Lisa Löfgren (lead guitar/backup vocals), and Lotta Wennström (drums). Prior to forming Tiger Bell, Lovisa, Lisa and Lotta were previously involved in Rewind, a band based in Luleå, Sweden.

== Beginnings ==
Their initial demo was recorded in early 2011, and their first show ensued soon afterwards. The following year, they toured Finland for the first time and played the Swedish festivals Umeå Open and Putte i Parken. In August 2012, they appeared on punk Swedish compilation Turist i tillvaron, Volume 4.

On March 18, 2013, they released their first EP called "Slaughter's Daughter". It was produced and mixed by Per Nordmark and Frans Hägglund. The title song came up after they discovered the Lulea Roller Derby team. During the second half of the month, they toured France for the "Les Femmes s'en Mêlent" Festival and Switzerland.

== European tours ==
March 2013 saw their first European tour.

On September 2, 2013, Tiger Bell announced a second European tour on their website and Facebook page that brought them to Switzerland, France, Italy, Germany and the Netherlands.

The third European tour took place from February through April 2014. They visited Norway, Sweden, Denmark, the Netherlands, Finland, Switzerland and France, where they opened for Jello Biafra in Bourgoin-Jallieu.

== First album release ==
On September 9, 2013, the band announced the release date of their first album to be on October 7, 2013. The name of the album is Don't Wanna Hear About Your Band! and was produced by Per Nordmark, Frans Hägglund and Tiger Bell.

== Festivals in 2014 ==
This Swedish band played Le Printemps de Bourges on April 24, 2014. Next, they played Bråvalla Festival in Norrköping, Sweden, in late June 2014. They played again Putte i Parken in Karlstad, Sweden in early July 2014. Then, they played RosRock Festival in Rossum, Netherlands on July 5, 2014.

Tiger Bell also played Rock En Seine in Paris on August 22, 2014.

== Awards and nominations ==
Tiger Bell got nominated for Swedish radio station Sveriges Radio P3 2014 Guld awards for both Best Rock/Metal band and Best Video for "Don't Wanna Hear About Your Band".

== Discography ==
=== Vinyl single ===
Wanna Wanna/German Boy (May 14, 2012)

=== EP ===
Slaughter's Daughter (March 18, 2013)

=== Albums ===
Don't Wanna Hear About Your Band! (October 7, 2013, Platinum Records)

== Music videos ==
Year	Song	Director
2012	"Wanna Wanna"	Leonora Halvars
2013	"Slaughter's Daughter"	Martin Åhlin
2013	"Look Into My Eyes"	Lovisa Reeder
2013	"Don't Wanna Hear About Your Band"	Emil Karlsson
2014	"Get Ready To Go"	Martin Åhlin and Olle Sundberg

== Hiatus ==
On August 22, 2015, the band announced on their Facebook page and their website an indefinite hiatus for personal reasons.
