= Hard Times (Laughing Hyenas album) =

Studio album by Laughing Hyenas
- Released: January 23, 1995
- Recorded: June 1994
- Studio: Easley, Memphis, TN
- Genre: Rock
- Length: 43:07
- Label: Touch and Go
- Producer: Doug Easley, Laughing Hyenas, Davis McCain

Laughing Hyenas chronology
Crawl (1992)	Hard Times (1995)

Hard Times is the third and final studio album by the American band Laughing Hyenas, released on January 23, 1995, by Touch and Go Records.

== Reception ==
Professional ratings
Review scores
Source	Rating
AllMusic	4.5/5 stars
Entertainment Weekly	A−

AllMusic critic Mark Deming noted the Rolling Stones influence and praised the album for "starting at the dark, scary heart of Exile on Main Street and moving on into places where few bands would dare to go". Entertainment Weekly gave it an A−, saying the album "has the malaise-fueled, foot-to-the-pedal pull of the Stooges or the Stones".

== Track listing ==
All tracks are written by Laughing Hyenas, except "Home of the Blues" by Johnny Cash, Douglas L. McAlphin and Glenn Douglas Tubb.

No.	Title	Length
1.	"Just Can't Win"	5:32
2.	"Hard Time Blues"	7:19
3.	"You're So Cruel"	4:41
4.	"Stay"	7:57
5.	"Slump"	6:14
6.	"Home of the Blues" (Johnny Cash cover)	4:53
7.	"Each Dawn I Die"	6:27

== Personnel ==
Adapted from the Hard Times liner notes.

Laughing Hyenas

- John Brannon – vocals
- Ron Sakowski – bass guitar, acoustic guitar (6)
- Larissa Strickland – electric guitar, acoustic guitar
- Todd Swalla – drums, percussion

Additional musicians and production

- Doug Easley – production, engineering, steel pedal guitar (6)
- Laughing Hyenas – production
- Davis McCain – production, engineering

== Release history ==
Region	Date	Label	Format	Catalog
United States	1995	Touch and Go	CD, CS, LP	TG136
