= Don't Wanna Hear About Your Band! =

Studio album by Tiger Bell
- Released: October 7, 2013
- Recorded: Riddarborgen Studios 2012
- Genre: Punk rock
- Length: 29:53
- Label: Platinum Records
- Producers: Per Nordmark, Frans Hägglund and Tiger Bell

Don't Wanna Hear About Your Band! is Swedish punk band Tiger Bell's first album. It was released on October 7, 2013.

== Track listing ==
1. "Boy, There You Go"
2. "Baby, You're A Murderer"
3. "Get Ready To Go"
4. "Don't Wanna Be 3"
5. "You Gotta Let Me Know"
6. "Valley Heights"
7. "Look Into My Eyes"
8. "Fragments"
9. "If You Want Something, Go And Get It"
10. "You're Going Down"
11. "Johnnie"
12. "Don't Wanna Hear About Your Band" (featuring Danko Jones)
