= Walls in the City =

Soundtrack album by The Denison/Kimball Trio
- Released: October 3, 1994
- Recorded: April 26, 1994
- Studio: Idful, Chicago, Illinois
- Genre: Post-rock, avant-garde jazz
- Length: 31:16
- Label: Skin Graft
- Producer: Duane Denison, Jim Kimball, Jim Sikora

DK3 chronology
Walls in the City (1994)	Soul Machine (1995)

Walls in the City is a soundtrack album by The Denison/Kimball Trio, released on October 3, 1994 by Skin Graft Records. It contains music from the short film of the same name, directed by independent filmmaker Jim Sikora. Most of the score was made up of pre-recorded material that Denison would match to a particular scene. The rest was recorded while the duo played while watching the film.

== Track listing ==
All music is composed by Duane Denison and Jim Kimball.

No.	Title	Length
1.	"Prelude"	3:29
2.	"Cold Light of Day"	2:06
3.	"Walk Away"	4:21
4.	"Reunion"	1:27
5.	"Harry's Theme"	3:17
6.	"One If by Land..."	1:41
7.	"Romantic Interlude"	2:49
8.	"Separate Checks"	3:27
9.	"Blue Corridor"	0:51
10.	"Postlude"	4:19
11.	"...Two If by Sea"	3:29

== Personnel ==
Adapted from Walls in the City liner notes.

The Denison/Kimball Trio

- Duane Denison – electric guitar
- Jim Kimball – drums, brushes, bongos

Production and additional personnel

- The Denison/Kimball Trio – production
- Dan Grzeca – illustrations
- Casey Rice – recording
- Jim Sikora – production

== Release history ==
Region	Date	Label	Format	Catalog
United States	1994	Skin Graft	CD, LP	GR 16
