= Pure (EP) =

EP by the Jesus Lizard
- Released: 1989
- Recorded: December 1988 and January 1989
- Studio: Kitty Empire, Chicago; and Studio Media, Evanston
- Genre: Noise rock; industrial rock
- Length: 14:19
- Label: Touch and Go
- Producer: Steve Albini

The Jesus Lizard chronology
Pure (1989)	Head (1990)

Professional ratings
Review scores
Source	Rating
AllMusic	3/5 stars

Pure is the debut EP by the Jesus Lizard, released in 1989. The cover artwork was by bassist David Wm. Sims. This is the only record by the Jesus Lizard recorded with a drum machine. Drummer Mac McNeilly joined the group soon after it was recorded.

The song "Blockbuster" was sung by bassist David Wm. Sims and was covered by the Melvins, with David Yow on vocals, on their album The Crybaby.

== Track listing ==
1. "Blockbuster" – 3:30
2. "Bloody Mary" – 1:59
3. "Rabid Pigs" – 2:09
4. "Starlet" – 2:42
5. "Happy Bunny Goes Fluff-Fluff Along" – 3:52

== Personnel ==
The Jesus Lizard

- Duane Denison - guitar
- David Wm. Sims - bass, vocals on "Blockbuster"
- David Yow - vocals
