= L-Seven =

American post-punk band

- Origin: Detroit, Michigan, U.S.
- Genres: Post-punk
- Years active: 1980–1983
- Labels: Touch and Go Special Forces, Third Man Records
- Past members: Larissa Stolarchuk (singer); Dave Rice (guitar); Charles McEvoy (keys, reeds); Mike Smith (drums); Frank Callis (bass); Scott Schuer (guitar); Kory Clarke (drums)

L-Seven was an American post-punk band from Detroit, Michigan, active from 1980 to 1983. Some band members had been formerly active in Detroit punk bands The Blind, Algebra Mothers, and Retro. The band was founded by Michael Smith (Smitt E. Smitty), Dave Rice, and Frank Callis, with Larissa Stolarchuck as the lead singer, who proved to be a gifted lyricist and front person. Chuck McEvoy played clavinet and saxophone for a brief time before he and Smith left the band. Smith went on to play with the band Figures on a Beach, and Kory Clarke and Scott Schuer (of the Attitudes) were brought into the band on drums and guitar. In February 1982, they recorded a self-titled three-song EP at Multi Trac Studios in Redford, Michigan. The EP was released as a 7" titled "L-Seven" by Touch and Go Special Forces in 1982. Although Touch and Go Special Forces was created to issue records of a different nature than the hardcore records that Touch and Go was issuing at the time, L-Seven's record was the only release under the "Special Forces" imprint. During their brief existence, L-Seven supported many well-known post-punk bands such as The Gun Club, Killing Joke, The Stranglers, Iggy Pop, Bauhaus, U2, and The Birthday Party.

The last of these was one of the inspirations for the Laughing Hyenas, the band Singer Larissa Stolarchuk (under the nom de plume Larissa Strickland) went on to form with former Negative Approach singer John Brannon. In the Hyenas, she switched to playing guitar, relinquishing vocal duties to Brannon.

Stolarchuk died on October 9, 2006. Drummer Kory Clarke fronts the long-running band Warrior Soul. Guitarist Dave Rice would go on to form The Linkletters with Schuer and L-Seven’s manager Ken Waagner and roadie Bill Methner, later forming Sandy Duncan's Eye and at one point auditioning for British post punk band Public Image Limited. In 2020, with the involvement of Sonic Youth drummer and Michigan native Steve Shelley, a long time fan of the band, Third Man Records released a compilation of unreleased L-Seven Demos and live recordings, which includes live renditions of the Misfits song "London Dungeon", and the medley of the Alice Cooper song "You Drive Me Nervous" and the Yardbirds song "Over, Under, Sideways, Down" which they used to close their live sets. The website Detroit Punk Archive has a compiled an oral history of the band.

== Discography ==
Title	Format	Label	Year released
L-Seven	7” EP	Touch and Go Special Forces	1982
L-Seven/ Unreleased Studio And Live	12” LP	Third Man Records	2020
