= Neutrons (album) =

Studio album by DK3
- Released: August 12, 1997
- Recorded: March 1997
- Studio: Chicago Recording Company (Chicago, IL)
- Genre: Post-rock, avant-garde jazz
- Length: 33:48
- Label: Quarterstick
- Producer: The Denison/Kimball Trio

DK3 chronology
Soul Machine (1995)	Neutrons (1997)

Professional ratings
Review scores
Source	Rating
AllMusic	4/5 stars
The Encyclopedia of Popular Music	3/5 stars
NME	5/10

Neutrons is the second studio album by the jazz band DK3. It was released in 1997 through Quarterstick Records.

== Critical reception ==
The Chicago Tribune wrote that the album "has an urban, sometimes bleak film noir undertow... the frenetic free jazz interplay between all members of the combo lifts this CD a notch above previous outings." Ox-Fanzine called the album "dark, cacophonic city music for an imaginary city film." CMJ New Music Monthly wrote that Neutrons "has a consistent tension despite its dynamic range."

== Track listing ==
All music is composed by The Denison/Kimball Trio, except "Neutrons" co-written by Jeff Lane and "Issa" co-written by Tom Bickley.

No.	Title	Length
1.	"Downriver"	4:15
2.	"Landshark Pt.2"	2:38
3.	"Monte's Casino"	4:17
4.	"Heavy Water"	6:32
5.	"The Traveling Salesman"	2:59
6.	"Neutrons"	5:37
7.	"Issa"	3:52
8.	"Lullaby"	3:38

== Personnel ==
Adapted from Neutrons liner notes.

The Denison/Kimball Trio

- Duane Denison – electric guitar, bass guitar
- Jim Kimball – drums, brushes, bongos
- Ken Vandermark – reeds

Additional musicians

- Tom Bickley – recorder (7)

Production and additional personnel

- Derek Michael Besant – illustrations
- The Denison/Kimball Trio – production
- Jeff Lane – mixing, recording

== Release history ==
Region	Date	Label	Format	Catalog
United States	1997	Quarterstick	CD, LP	QS48
