= P.W. Long =

American musician, journalist and documentary filmmaker

Preston Wright Long III (aka Preston Cleveland) is an American musician, journalist and documentary filmmaker.

He is best known as lead singer and guitar player for the groups Wig, Mule and P.W. Long's Reelfoot; most of his recorded work has been released and/or distributed by Touch and Go Records. Long has released four solo albums; slice-of-life narratives typically delivered as hard rock with country music flourishes. Critic Zac Johnson favorably compares Long's music to Johnny Cash, writing, "both share the same kind of working-class, tough-guy, busted-knuckle, rattlesnake-eyed persona."

== Music ==
P.W. Long, who is particularly discreet with personal details, appears to have been raised in Las Vegas, Nevada; Ypsilanti, Michigan (see Mule's "Obion," and its reference to an "Ypsilanti Man"); and for periods in Virginia. He was stationed in Norfolk while serving in the US Navy's Atlantic Fleet. He eventually wound up in Detroit. Purported to be the brother of the frontman of The Laughing Hyenas but this is untrue.

His earliest work was with the band Wig, and it is his voice that you hear on the Lying Next to You record. Sometime in the early 1990s, Long began a side project with the Laughing Hyenas' rhythm section, Kevin Munro and Jim Kimball. They put together a concoction of field hollers, backwoods legends, hellbilly canon and mixed it with a semi-punk, semi-metallic musical assault that was best described as northern redneck, but intelligent, clamor.

Calling themselves Mule, they released a single in 1991 or 1992 containing the song Tennessee Hustler. Their first self-titled album debuted shortly thereafter on Touch and Go Records sub-label, "Quarterstick", and was recorded by Nirvana recording engineer Steve Albini (though credited in the liner notes to a fictitious Lenard Johns).

While it had the raucousness of the Hyenas, and certain punk and alternative sensibilities, Mule was quite different. The album opened with Long shouting "We left town to the sound of buckshot rain" on Mississippi Breaks.

As Long. himself later admitted, he did not really know how to play guitar when he started with Mule, or at least not all that "slickly" to use his word. Instead, he used a variety of open tunings and such, coupled with a simple feel for what was right, to create his sound. Never bounded by the need for classic guitar solos, Long still put the guitar at the forefront with innovative melody lines and breaks.

The self-titled album continued on with "I'm Hell", the rawking "What Every White Nigger Knows", the eerie "Drown", the trip into Old NorthWest folk music with "Now I Truly Understand", the duet with Munro on "Mama's Reason to Cry", "Lucky" and "Sugarcane Zuzu", with its admonition from P-Bone's grandfather that "You can wish in one hand, and shit in the other, and see which one fills up first."

Mule's first album ended up on Spin's 'Ten Best Albums of 1993 You Didn't Hear' list and prompted endless touring by the band. New songs were always in progress, with Long sometimes simply humming or yodling words during live performances over the new music before lyrics were complete.

Mule followed up their debut album with the EP Wrung and the album If I Don't Six in 1994. Both are mid 1990s punkabilly/country metal standards, with Wrung in particular fitting the definition of hard to define. The song/story of "Searchlight" is evil, mean and foreboding. The down and dirty call and response duet by Long and Munro on "Rope and the Cuckold" is another highlight. "If I Don't Six" went in a slightly different direction, with some piano, a bit more soul but just as much ass whuppin'. In particular, "Obion", "Nowhere's Back", and "Pent" are songs of raw power, loneliness, depression and yet beautiful soulfulness.

Long left the band in 1996, after their relocation to Philadelphia, and began playing local solo acoustic shows.

Long then formed the band Reelfoot with bassist Dan Maister (1971–2005), and Mac McNeilly, ex-drummer of The Jesus Lizard, releasing the albums We Didn't See You on Sunday and Push Me Again in 1997 and 1998 respectively—again with Quarterstick. After this, Long went on a musical hiatus, broken by occasional gigs. During this time he directed the music video for the song You're the Reason by Hank Williams III, produced by former Babes in Toyland bassist Maureen Herman. The video received heavy rotation on CMT in summer of 2000. In late 2000, Long moved to New York City and started writing professionally, beginning with a gig as the New York nightclub and restaurant critic for London's Crush Guide magazine.

In 2002, the band Shellac, who were curating the All Tomorrow's Parties music festival in Rye, asked Long to appear, and he shared the stage with bands such as Wire and The Fall. After this, Long released his first solo album, Remembered, in 2003.

== Writing ==
Long's writing continued with work for the New York Sports Express, The Buffalo Beast (created by Rolling Stone Contributing Editor Matt Taibbi and now called The Beast), Vice Magazine/London, The Fix on the now-defunct fuzz.com, project-noise.org, and other publications and sites.

== Film and video ==
In 2004, Long pursued a degree in Film/Directing and graduated in 2006. That same year his latest solo album God Bless the Drunkard's Dog was released on vinyl-only imprint Black Diamond, under Long's longtime European label, Southern Records. The album's song "Let 'em Roll" was featured in the Afghanistan War documentary film, At War.

Long began work in independent and industrial documentary filmmaking and in 2007 he again worked with Matt Taibbi, this time on projects for Rolling Stone Video, most notably shooting "On the Road With John McCain: A Video Report by Matt Taibbi." In 2008, one of Long's industrial documentaries garnered him an obscure media award at an annual medical convention in Philadelphia. Later that year, he relocated to London to work with Vice magazine's new internet TV venture, VBS.TV. In early 2009, Long returned to the U.S. to begin work on a documentary production with non-profit Project Noise and Tom Morello's Axis of Justice Foundation.

== Discography ==
Wig:

- 1990 - Lying Next to You - 12-inch Mini-album
- 1991 - Just Obscene/All the Love in the World - 7-inch

Mule:

- 1992 - Tennessee Hustler/Black Bottom - 7-inch
- 1992 - I'm Hell/To Love Somebody - 7-inch
- 1993 - Mule - LP/CD/CS
- 1994 - Wrung - 12-inch EP/CD/CS
- 1994 - If I Don't Six - LP/CD/CS
- 1997 - Soul Sound - a split 7-inch w/ Shellac

P.W. Long with Reelfoot:

- 1997 - We Didn't See You on Sunday - LP/CD
- 1998 - Push Me Again - CD

P.W. Long:

- 2003 - Remembered - CD
- 2006 - God Bless The Drunkard's Dog - LP/CD

Young James Long:

- 2007 You Ain't Know The Man - CD EP
