= Umeå Open =

Annual music festival in Sweden

- Genre: Pop, Rock
- Dates: 7-9 April
- Location: Umeå
- Inaugurated: 1998
- Website: www.umeaopen.se

Umeå Open is an annual music festival taking place in Umeå, Västerbotten, Sweden at the end of March. It is arranged by the local culture organization Kulturföreningen Humlan. Bands and artists from Europe, America and Asia perform alongside acts from Sweden and local acts in the Umeå Folkets Hus venue in the center of Umeå. Other venues where Umeå Open takes place are: Hamnmagasinet, Tegskyrkan, Verket and Guitars - The Museum.

Along with music, Umeå Open has a conference and a host of related events. Born from the popularity of the 1997 PopStad award to Umeå by Swedish radio, the festival has been held since 1998 and is regularly sold out in advance.

== Artists who have performed at Umeå Open ==
=== International Artists ===
- The Magnetic Fields
- Yelle
- Charli XCX
- Alphaville
- Le Tigre
- Kavinsky
- Interpol
- M O N E Y
- The Afghan Whigs
- Atmosphere
- The Bell Orchestre
- Chicks on Speed
- Ed Harcourt
- Euroboys
- Handsomeboy Technique
- Jeans Team
- The Jesus Lizard
- The Make-Up
- Mark Eitzel
- Mates Of State
- Mayhem
- Mental Kombat
- Motorpsycho
- P.K. 14
- Poison The Well
- The Pipettes
- Stereo Total
- Teenage Fanclub
- Turbonegro

=== Swedish artists ===
- Refused
- First Aid Kit
- Cult of Luna
- Robyn
- Hellacopters
- Meshuggah
- José González
- Timbuktu
- Håkan Hellström
- Mando Diao
- bob hund
- The Bear Quartet
- Den Svenska Björnstammen
- Maskinen
- Slagsmålsklubben
- Daniel Adams-Ray
- The Soundtrack of Our Lives
- The Ark
- Sahara Hotnights
- Salem Al Fakir
- Asta Kask
- Jens Lekman
- Doktor Kosmos
- Entombed
- Final Exit
- Frida Hyvönen
- Ida Redig
- Lilla Namo
- Det Stora Monstret
- Grand Tone Music
- The Haunted
- Heed
- Honey Is Cool
- Isolation Years
- Komeda
- Nicolai Dunger
- Nocturnal Rites
- The (International) Noise Conspiracy
- Randy
- Silverbullit
- Väärt
- Caotico
- eberhard kcch
- Üni Foreman
- Gonza-Ra
- Matriarkatet
- Everyday Mistakes
- Starmarket
- Tiger Bell
- Tingsek
- The Vectors
- The Wannadies
- Weeping Willows
- Abhinanda
