= Life of Crime (album) =

Studio album by Laughing Hyenas
- Released: September 1990
- Recorded: June 1990
- Studio: Smart, Madison, WI
- Genre: Punk blues
- Length: 30:01
- Label: Touch and Go
- Producer: Laughing Hyenas, Butch Vig

Laughing Hyenas chronology
You Can't Pray a Lie (1989)	Life of Crime (1990)	Crawl (1992)

Professional ratings
Review scores
Source	Rating
AllMusic	4/5 stars
The A.V. Club	(very favorable)
Trouser Press	(very favorable)

Life of Crime is the second studio album by American garage rock band Laughing Hyenas, released in September 1990 by Touch and Go Records. It was reissued in 1992 accompanied with You Can't Pray a Lie.

== Track listing ==
All tracks are written by Laughing Hyenas, except "Life of Crime" by Cliff Roman.

Side one
No.	Title	Length
1.	"Everything I Want"	4:00
2.	"Hitman"	3:50
3.	"Let It Burn"	3:09
4.	"Kick"	3:40

Side two
No.	Title	Length
1.	"Here We Go Again"	3:43
2.	"Wild Heart"	3:21
3.	"Outlaw"	5:46
4.	"Life of Crime" (The Weirdos cover)	2:28

== Personnel ==
Adapted from the Life of Crime liner notes.

Laughing Hyenas

- John Brannon – vocals
- Jim Kimball – drums
- Kevin Strickland – bass guitar
- Larissa Strickland – guitar

Production and additional personnel

- Laughing Hyenas – production
- Butch Vig – production
- Bill Widener – front cover illustration

== Release history ==
Region	Date	Label	Format	Catalog
United States	1990	Touch and Go	CS, LP	TG61
