= John Brannon (musician) =

American singer (born 1961)

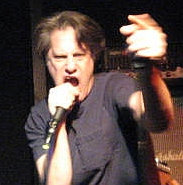
- Brannon with Easy Action at Mac's Bar, Lansing, Michigan on November 8, 2008

Background information
- Born: August 15, 1961 (age 64); Pontiac, Michigan, US
- Origin: Detroit, Michigan, US
- Genres: Hardcore punk, punk blues, post-hardcore, garage punk, noise rock, garage rock
- Occupations: Musician, cook
- Instruments: Vocals, trumpet
- Years active: 1981–present
- Labels: Touch and Go Records, Reptillian Records

John Lamar Brannon (born August 15, 1961) is the lead vocalist for the American hardcore punk band Negative Approach. He also served as the frontman for Laughing Hyenas and Easy Action.

== History ==
=== Early years ===
John Brannon was born on August 15, 1961, in Pontiac, Michigan. His father was a minister and would take preaching jobs, moving between New York, New Jersey and Michigan, and finally settling in Detroit. Brannon's parents divorced when he was 9 years old and he embraced rock and roll.

Brannon was discovered by guitarist Mike Levitt who was delivering newspapers to Brannon's house when he heard him singing an Alice Cooper song from inside the house in 1975. Knowing each other from middle school, Brannon was drafted to sing in Fallout, a group with Levitt on guitar, John Wise on bass and vocals, and Tom Wisely on drums and vocals. The band enjoyed great popularity on the east side of Detroit, and with a sound that was influenced by glam rock but came out louder and more like punk rock, played to packed houses at various venues such as Notre Dame and Regina high schools, and the Grosse Pointe War Memorial. The response was so great to Fallout that the band became known for riots and violence after incidents at a series of shows in the summer of 1976. The band also put on nightly shows attended by hundreds of people in the basement of Brannon's mother's house, which had been painted black and converted to a rehearsal and performance venue by the band. After winning the Grosse Pointe battle of the bands twice, Fallout broke up due to creative tensions between Wise and Wisely who wanted to pursue progressive and folk rock, and Brannon and Levitt who wanted to play louder and less commercial material. Within a few weeks, Brannon formed the band Static, and Levitt left to join another group. Static was heavily influenced by the glam acts of the time, such as Alice Cooper and the New York Dolls, and would dress up and stage theatrical performances. Eventually Brannon grew disinterested in the scene and became drawn to the more aggressive nature of punk rock and hardcore.

=== Negative Approach and Laughing Hyenas ===
In August 1981, he formed Negative Approach with Pete Zelewski. Zelewski soon departed and Brannon was joined by Chris "Opie" Moore and Graham and Rob McCulloch. Negative Approach performed frequently at the Freezer Theatre in Detroit's Cass Corridor in 1982.

The line-up recorded a 10-song 7-inch EP and Tied Down, their sole full-length album, and released it through Touch and Go Records in 1983. Artistic differences and tension within the group caused the members to disband and pursue separate projects. The band went on hiatus for decades before its reunion.

Brannon then formed the Laughing Hyenas with Larissa Strickland from L-Seven in 1985. The band released three studio albums and two EPs before breaking up in 1995.

== Discography ==
Negative Approach

- Negative Approach EP (Touch & Go, 1982)
- Tied Down (Touch & Go, 1983)

Laughing Hyenas

- Come Down to the Merry Go Round EP (Touch and Go, 1987)
- You Can't Pray a Lie (Touch and Go, 1989)
- Life of Crime (Touch and Go, 1990)
- Crawl (Touch and Go, 1992)
- Hard Times (Touch and Go, 1995)

Easy Action

- Easy Action (Reptilian, 2001)
- Friends of Rock & Roll (Reptilian, 2005)
