= Puss / Oh, the Guilt =

"Puss" / "Oh, the Guilt"
- UK picture sleeve

Single by the Jesus Lizard and Nirvana
- Released: February 22, 1993
- Recorded: 1992
- Genre: Post-hardcore; grunge
- Length: 6:43
- Label: Touch and Go Records
- Songwriter: The Jesus Lizard/Kurt Cobain
- Producers: Steve Albini ("Puss")/ Barrett Jones ("Oh, the Guilt")

The Jesus Lizard singles chronology
"Mouth Breather" (1990)	"Puss" / "Oh, the Guilt" (1993)	"Mailman" (1996)

Nirvana singles chronology
"In Bloom" (1992)	"Oh, the Guilt" (1993)	"Heart-Shaped Box" (1993)

Music video
- "Puss" on YouTube

"Puss" / "Oh, the Guilt" is a split single, released as a double A-side, from the American rock bands the Jesus Lizard and Nirvana, released via Touch and Go Records. It charted at number 10 on CMJ magazine's US retail chart. It also reached number 12 on the UK singles chart; it was the Jesus Lizard's only hit single in the UK, and Nirvana's sixth.

== Recording and release ==
=== Background ===
"Puss" first appeared on the 1992 album Liar and was recorded by Steve Albini, who would later record Nirvana's third and final album, In Utero. The video for "Puss" showed a man being welded in a chair, so it was banned from some television stations.

"Oh, the Guilt" was recorded by Barrett Jones on April 7, 1992 in Seattle, Washington. The song was re-released in 2004 on the Nirvana rarities box set With the Lights Out and in 2005 on the compilation album Sliver: The Best of the Box, although on these latter releases the song was remixed by Adam Kasper, and does not include the sound of cigarette lighter clicks present on the original mix.

=== Release ===
The single was released on February 22, 1993, and includes the songs "Puss" by the Jesus Lizard and "Oh, the Guilt" by Nirvana. It was released on 1,500 limited edition 7 inch vinyl picture discs in Australia, on blue 7 inch vinyl and CD single in the UK, and on 7 inch vinyl, CD single, and cassette single in the US. According to nirvana-discography.com, the total world-wide release was 100,000 copies but according to John Rocco's The Nirvana Companion it was 200,000 copies. The cover art for the single is a painting by Malcolm Bucknall called "Old Indian and White Poodle".

David Yow, vocalist of the Jesus Lizard, later said of the release: "We had to figure out, well, do we want to do this and look like we're riding on Nirvana's coattails, or we could just do it and not worry about it, which is what we ended up doing."

=== Reception ===
The British magazine Music Week described "Oh, the Guilt" as a "rougher, underproduced example of their pop-metal" and "Puss" as "a fiercer, messier hardcore thang". An August 1993 Billboard article about the Touch and Go record label described the single as having "sold in great numbers". Readers of CMJ voted it the fifth-best 7 inch single of 1993.

== Track listing ==
No.	Title	Length
1.	"Puss"	3:19
2.	"Oh, the Guilt"	3:24

== Personnel ==
The Jesus Lizard

- David Yow – vocals
- Duane Denison – guitar
- David Wm. Sims – bass guitar
- Mac McNeilly – drums

Nirvana

- Kurt Cobain – vocals, guitar
- Krist Novoselic – bass guitar
- Dave Grohl – drums

== Charts ==
Chart (1993)	Peak position
Australian Top 20 Alternative Singles (ARIA)	3
European Hot 100 Singles (Music & Media)	36
UK Singles (Official Charts)	12
UK Network Singles (MRIB)	9
UK Indie Singles (Melody Maker)	2
UK Indie Singles (Music Week)	3
UK Indie Singles (NME)	2
UK Rock & Metal Singles (CIN)	3
US Progressive Retail (CMJ)	10

== Unreleased versions ==
Nirvana recorded an instrumental demo version of "Oh, the Guilt" on January 1, 1991, at The Music Source studios in Seattle, Washington, but it remains officially unreleased. At the same studio session the band also recorded demo versions of songs "Aneurysm", "Even In His Youth", "All Apologies", "On a Plain", "Radio Friendly Unit Shifter", and "Token Eastern Song". All of these also remain officially unreleased except for "Aneurysm" and "Even In His Youth" which featured as B-sides to the "Smells Like Teen Spirit" single, and "All Apologies" which was released on the 20th anniversary deluxe and super-deluxe versions of the In Utero album in 2013.
