= BunaB =

Novelty item

BunaB was the name of a line of purposely useless novelty products, promoted as if they were useful via carefully written marketing hype. They were created by American radio host Al Crowder (1904-1981). Beginning in the 1950s BunaBs were purportedly produced by the firm of Orville K. Snav and Associates and distributed from its headquarters in Snav Towers, Mason City, Iowa. The company's chief product was the Improved No. 7 BunaB, an assembly of two 1 3/4-inch (4.4 cm) insulated wires, red and blue, held together with neatly applied yellow electrical tape at the ends. BunaBs have been described as examples of primitive conceptual art.

== History ==
In 1951 Al Crowder was a music store employee and radio host at KSMN in Mason City. A cryptic gift of an object resembling a water jug from Crowder's father-in-law to Crowder's son inspired Crowder to write to the manufacturer, the International Latex Corporation, to ask what the object was. The response, received from E.C. Jakoswiak, Assistant to the President, stated that the bladder was a component of a World War II inflatable attack boat. Inspired by the apparently useless object and by the response, Crowder created the Improved BunaB #7, the first of the line. The BunaB

"...will meet, or exceed specifications set up by the industry for accuracy, durability and simplicity of operation. No moving parts insures constant stability... With a minimum of practice, results equaling the conventional instrument may be expected."

The instructions continued:

"After prolonged use the BunaB may indicate a variation of one or two percent when checked against a new BunaB. In that case, the old one should be discarded immediately. Satisfaction in positive results will readily offset the slight cost of replacement."

Those who ordered the BunaB #7 received, in addition to their device, a registration card that, when returned to Snav Towers, automatically made the recipient an "Assistant to the President." Shortly afterwards a personal letter from Crowder would arrive, discussing in lengthy detail the difficulties that attended Snav's business empire and personal life. Crowder's use of the Snav name dated to a time in Fort Wayne, Indiana, when he would send a daily (but empty) envelope to a local radio station that was soliciting letters from listeners.

Crowder was "Chief Assistant to the President" from 1951 to his death in 1981. After he died, his wife Louise carried on as "Dame Minerva P. Snav" and managed the correspondence with the approximately 50,000 Assistants to the President and Key Personnel in the Field from the Hall of Science (an upstairs bedroom, said to cover "approximately 9000 square inches") at Snav Towers (the Crowder residence).

== BunaB product line ==
Snav produced a number of other BunaB products.

- BunaB #2, also known as Zudirk. A board game with unplayable rules. In fact, the rules clearly stated that they were unplayable.
- BunaB #3, the "Man's Between Shave Lotion," an apparently empty plastic bottle, the contents to be reconstituted by the addition of water.
- BunaB #4, a small dial with an adhesive pad that, when attached to a surface, could be moved between "OFF" and "ON."
- BunaB #5, a record to be played while watching television. It was entirely blank. Side 1 was noted to be particularly suitable for "drama, mystery, adventure and afternoon serials" while Side 2 was best for "panel shows, interviews, news, weather and sports." The record could be played at all standard speeds, including 33 1/3, 45, 78 and the Edison 80 rpm standards with satisfactory results.
- BunaB #6, remarkably similar to the Improved #7 BunaB to the extent of being identical.
- BunaB #7, the company's signature product. About 40,000 BunaB #7s were produced. The BunaB #7 is noted for its durability, ease of use and resistance to obsolescence.

While not a part of the BunaB line, Snav also produced the Post Meridian Morning (PMM) Shield. This black half-disc could be attached to the left side of a clock dial to obscure the morning hours. Snav also marketed the "Exigency Conversion Apparatus" (ECA), a plastic bag containing labels "MEN" and "WOMEN", allowing instant conversion of any room to a restroom. The C-K Key, made of Snav-Metal, opened all models of chastity belt. Delinquent accounts were referred to a Snav subsidiary, the Octopus Collection Agency.

== Media coverage ==
Crowder appeared four times on The Garry Moore Show to discuss the BunaB #7, introducing the BunaB #5 on the show in the fall of 1957. In April 1958 Crowder was the subject of a Playboy profile entitled "The Little World of Orville K. Snav." In the Bullwinkle cartoon series, Bullwinkle read poetry from a music stand holding the "BunaB Anthem", first aired in September 1961. Jay Ward, the producer of Bullwinkle, awarded Snav a "Certificate of Exceptional Adequacy".

== Notable BunaB owners ==
Television host Dave Garroway gave away BunaB #7s to test recipients' sense of humor. The BunaB he gave to Jimmy Carter was returned. H.R. Haldeman bought one for Richard Nixon. There is no record of whether Nixon found it funny. All of the Mercury 7 astronauts had BunaBs. Other "Assistants to the President" included Groucho Marx, Hugh Downs, Jerry Lewis, Helen Hayes, Barry Goldwater (who termed it "Absolutely irreplaceable. Use it constantly"), Cary Grant, Myrna Loy ("Absolutely indespensible!") and Hugh Hefner.

== As conceptual art ==
The BunaB line of products has been cited as an early form of conceptual art, as described in the 2001 Dictionary of the Avant-Gardes. BunaBs #3 and #5 are in particular cited as examples of praecisio, defined as the act of making a point through silence.
