= Blue (The Jesus Lizard album) =

Studio album by the Jesus Lizard
- Released: April 21, 1998
- Recorded: Summer 1997
- Studio: Chicago Recording Company, Chicago, Illinois
- Genre: Noise rock
- Length: 42:05
- Label: Capitol
- Producer: Andy Gill

The Jesus Lizard chronology
The Jesus Lizard (EP) (1998)	Blue (1998)	Bang (2000)

Singles from Blue
- 1. "A Tale of Two Women" Released: May 18, 1998

Professional ratings
Review scores
Source	Rating
AllMusic	3/5 stars
Rolling Stone	3.5/5 stars
Entertainment Weekly	B+
Pitchfork	7.3/10
Spin	2/10

Blue is the sixth studio album by the Jesus Lizard, released in 1998. Produced by Andy Gill, it is something of a departure for The Jesus Lizard, exploring some of the more experimental instincts hinted at on earlier songs like "Happy Bunny Goes Fluff-Fluff Along" on Pure. It is one of only two releases by the band to feature new drummer Jim Kimball, the other being the self-titled EP released two months prior. A limited edition vinyl pressing was released on Jetset Records on April 21, 1998. The album was released in Canada only by Sonic Unyon Records under license from Capitol Records in the USA after EMI Canada passed on releasing the album.

== Track listing ==
All tracks composed by the Jesus Lizard

1. "I Can Learn" – 3:10
2. "Horse Doctor Man" – 3:58
3. "Eucalyptus" – 5:59
4. "A Tale of Two Women" – 3:28
5. "Cold Water" – 2:45
6. "And Then the Rain" – 3:13
7. "Postcoital Glow" – 3:31
8. "Until It Stopped to Die" – 3:56
9. "Soft Damage" – 4:05
10. "Happy Snakes" – 3:00
11. "Needles for Teeth (Version)" – 3:40
12. "Terremoto" – 1:20

== Personnel ==
The Jesus Lizard

- David Yow - vocals
- Duane Denison - guitar, keyboards
- David Sims - bass, keyboards
- Jim Kimball - drums

Technical

- Andy Gill - producer, mixing
- Jeff Lane - engineer, mixing
- Ron Lowe - engineer
- Joe Barresi - mixing
- Howie Weinberg - mastering
