= Lash (EP) =

EP by the Jesus Lizard
- Released: August 20, 1993
- Genre: Noise rock; alternative rock; indie rock
- Length: 16:48
- Label: Touch and Go Records

The Jesus Lizard chronology
| Liar (1992) | Lash (1993) | Show (1994) |

Professional ratings
Review scores
| Source | Rating |
|---|---|
| AllMusic | 3/5 stars |

Lash is the second EP from the Jesus Lizard. It was released in 1993 on Touch and Go Records.

== Track listing ==
1. "Glamorous" - 3:07
2. "Deaf as a Bat" - 1:40
3. "Lady Shoes (Live)" - 2:37
4. "Killer McHann (Live)" - 2:11
5. "Bloody Mary (Live)" - 2:41
6. "Monkey Trick (Live)" - 4:32
