= Tonight You Look Like a Spider =

Studio album by David Yow
- Released: June 25, 2013
- Genre: Dark ambient; drone; experimental rock; avant-garde; sound collage
- Length: 48:58
- Label: Joyful Noise

Professional ratings
Aggregate scores
Source	Rating
Metacritic	70/100
Review scores
Source	Rating
AllMusic	3/5 stars
Exclaim!	8/10
Pitchfork	6.5/10

Tonight You Look Like a Spider is the debut album of David Yow, released on June 25, 2013 by Joyful Noise Recordings.

== Track listing ==
All music is composed by David Yow.

Side one
No.	Title	Length
1.	"Opening Suite"	10:39
2.	"Roundhouse"	1:41
3.	"Senator Robinson's Speech"	3:24
4.	"Bleth My Thoul"	1:08
5.	"Intermission (Lawrence of a Labia)"	5:01
6.	"Tonight You Look Like a Spider"	2:07

Side two
No.	Title	Length
1.	"Uncle"	4:10
2.	"Thee Itch"	4:08
3.	"The Door"	1:31
4.	"Visualize This"	12:02
5.	"Conclusion"	3:08

== Personnel ==
- David Yow – Instruments
- Pete Lyman – mastering

== Release history ==
Region	Date	Label	Format	Catalog
United States	2013	Joyful Noise	CD, LP	JNR116
