= Al Crowder =

American radio host, music teacher, and humorist

Al Crowder (1904–1981) was an American radio host, music teacher and humorist, best known as the creator of the BunaB line of products. Crowder's BunaBs and related merchandise, ostensibly produced by "Orville K. Snav and Associates," are considered an early form of conceptual art. Crowder received nationwide exposure through appearances on The Garry Moore Show and in a 1957 profile in Playboy.

Crowder was born in Louisville, Kentucky in 1904. In the 1920s he toured as a banjo and accordion player and as an announcer at shows and on the radio. By the early 1930s he was teaching music in Fort Wayne, Indiana, moving to Mason City, Iowa in 1939. He worked at the Vance Music Store and Carleton Stewart Music in Mason City. teaching and playing the banjo, accordion, clarinet, saxophone and bass clarinet. In 1951 Crowder was on local radio as "Grandma's Disc Jockey," playing music from his personal collection of early recordings.

== BunaB ==
In 1951 Crowder conceived the BunaB #7, a device of obscure function that nevertheless "...will meet, or exceed specifications set up by the industry for accuracy, durability and simplicity of operation." Crowder developed a back story for the product, creating the firm of Orville K. Snav and Associates as manufacturers of the BunaB line and a variety of other fanciful products, operating from "Snav Towers", which in reality was Crowder's house at 111 North Jefferson Street. He was assisted by his wife Louise, alternately known as "Dame Minerva P. Snav", who continued to support the BunaB line after Al's death in 1981.

Crowder, who had taught Herb Shriner to play instruments in Fort Wayne, appeared on Shriner's television show in the 1950s. He appeared four times on The Garry Moore Show and was profiled in "The Little World of Orville K. Snav" in 1957 in Playboy.

Crowder first used the name "Orville K. Snav" when he lived in Fort Wayne, sending empty envelopes to a radio station on a daily basis from Snav in response to an appeal from the station for letters from listeners. Marketing of the Snav line of "aids to nicer living" included an annual Christmas catalog, sent to the company's approximately 50,000 "Assistants to the President and Key Personnel in the Field" during the December 15 Mailing Frolic. Crowder came up with other BunaB products, ranging from the #2 to the #6, and several other Snav products, including a universal chastity belt key in either Snav-Metal or 14K gold.

Crowder died on March 10, 1981, aged 77.
