= Shot (album) =

1996 studio album by the Jesus Lizard

Studio album by the Jesus Lizard
- Released: April 16, 1996
- Recorded: 1995
- Genre: Noise rock
- Length: 43:00
- Label: Capitol
- Producer: GGGarth

The Jesus Lizard chronology
Down (1994)	Shot (1996)	The Jesus Lizard (1998)

Professional ratings
Review scores
Source	Rating
AllMusic	2/5 stars
The Encyclopedia of Popular Music	3/5 stars
Entertainment Weekly	B−
MusicHound Rock: The Essential Album Guide	3.5/5 stars
NME	3.5/5 stars
Pitchfork	6.2/10
The New Rolling Stone Album Guide	3.5/5 stars

Shot is an album by the band the Jesus Lizard, its first release on Capitol Records. Some copies of the album were accompanied by a documentary titled "Sho(r)t".

== Production ==
Impressed by his work on the album Houdini by Melvins, the band hired producer GGGarth to record Shot. Of note on the album is the very different production of David Yow's vocals, which are now much clearer and higher in the mix than on previous recordings.

Shot is the first studio album by the band that was not recorded by Steve Albini. It has been widely held that Steve Albini refused to work with the band because they had signed to a major label, although Albini himself denied this in comments made to a review of the 2009 reissue of the Touch and Go catalog that appears on the Paste Magazine web site.

== Critical reception ==
Shot became the band's only album to chart in the US, as it peaked at No. 28 on Billboard's Top Heatseekers chart.

Trouser Press wrote that "songs like 'Thumbscrews' and 'Skull of a German' prove Yow hasn’t lost anything in terms of horror-storytelling, but his stab at 'singing' (much in the manner he employed in his Scratch Acid days) is ill-advised." Kerrang! wrote that Shot "features [David Wm.] Sims’ best bass playing," praising "the spiralling flourish at 2:37 on 'Skull Of A German'." Perfect Sound Forever wrote that "even though the band is bathed in 'clean' conventional studio mix, they are still the Jesus Lizard and that means dark, ugly and weird." The Rough Guide to Rock called the album "another wedge of death-metal-grunge that showed little sign of burnout."

== Track listing ==
All songs written by the Jesus Lizard.

1. "Thumper" – 3:31
2. "Blue Shot" – 4:13
3. "Thumbscrews" – 3:10
4. "Good Riddance" – 3:15
5. "Mailman" – 3:26
6. "Skull of a German" – 3:42
7. "Trephination" – 3:34
8. "More Beautiful Than Barbie" – 2:50
9. "Too Bad About the Fire" – 4:00
10. "Churl" – 2:53
11. "Now Then" – 2:34
12. "Inamorata" – 3:05
13. "Pervertedly Slow" – 2:40
14. "Shut Up" (Japanese CD only bonus track) – 1:20
15. "Bad Guy" (Japanese CD only bonus track) – 2:20

== Personnel ==
- GGGarth - producer
- Jeff Lane and GGGarth - engineer
- Joe Barresi - mixing
- Chad Bamford - second mixing engineer
- Howie Weinberg - mastering
- Michael Lavine - photography
