= The Denison/Kimball Trio =

Musical duo

- Genres: Post-rock, avant-garde jazz
- Years active: 1994–1999
- Labels: Quarterstick, Skin Graft
- Past members: Duane Denison; Jim Kimball; Ken Vandermark

The Denison/Kimball Trio (sometimes known as DK3) were a musical duo consisting of American guitarist Duane Denison and American drummer Jim Kimball. Their music was completely instrumental and heavily influenced by jazz, the avant-garde and movie scores. The group's debut album was the soundtrack to Walls in the City, a short film directed by independent filmmaker Jim Sikora and featuring Jesus Lizard front-man David Yow in a bit role. The band's name was changed to DK3 with the release of their third album Neutrons, which included Ken Vandermark on reeds. The members parted ways in 1999 to pursue other interests, with Denison touring for Hank Williams III and forming Tomahawk in 2000.

== Discography ==
- Walls in the City (Skin Graft, 1994)
- Soul Machine (Skin Graft, 1995)
- Neutrons (Quarterstick, 1997)
