= Liar (The Jesus Lizard album) =

Studio album by the Jesus Lizard
- Released: October 10, 1992
- Recorded: The second half of May '92
- Studio: Chicago Recording Company
- Genre: Noise rock; post-hardcore
- Length: 34:16
- Label: Touch and Go
- Producer: Steve Albini

The Jesus Lizard chronology
Goat (1991)	Liar (1992)	Lash (1993)

Singles from Liar
- 1. "Puss" Released: February 15, 1993

Liar is the third studio album by American alternative rock band the Jesus Lizard, released in 1992 by Touch and Go Records. The album is considered to be among the band's best work: according to Mark Deming of AllMusic, "Liar isn't quite the wildest or weirdest album the Jesus Lizard ever made, but it may well be the strongest, and perhaps the best." The artwork is "Allegory of Death" by painter Malcolm Bucknall, who also provided art for the album Down and the "Puss/Oh, the Guilt" split single with Nirvana.

== Critical reception ==
Professional ratings
Review scores
Source	Rating
AllMusic	4.5/5 stars
Beats Per Minute	90%
Chicago Tribune	4/4 stars
NME	7/10
Paste	80/100
Pitchfork	9.2/10
Q	3/5 stars
The Rolling Stone Album Guide	4/5 stars
Select	5/5
Spin	8/10

In 2003, Liar was ranked as the 58th best album of the 1990s by the online music magazine Pitchfork.

== Track listing ==
All tracks are written by the Jesus Lizard, except where noted.

No.	Title	Length
1.	"Boilermaker"	2:14
2.	"Gladiator"	3:59
3.	"The Art of Self-Defense"	2:38
4.	"Slave Ship"	4:12
5.	"Puss"	3:19
6.	"Whirl"	4:19
7.	"Rope"	2:18
8.	"Perk"	2:30
9.	"Zachariah"	5:42
10.	"Dancing Naked Ladies"	2:56

Deluxe Remastered Reissue
No.	Title	Length
11.	"blank track"	0:09
12.	"Wheelchair Epidemic" (The Dicks)	2:11
13.	"Dancing Naked Ladies"	3:02
14.	"Gladiator"	3:58
15.	"Boilermaker"	2:21
