= The Jesus Lizard (EP) =

EP by the Jesus Lizard
- Released: February 17, 1998
- Genre: Noise rock; post-hardcore; alternative rock
- Length: 17:18
- Label: Jetset Records
- Producer: Andy Gill, John Cale, Jim O'Rourke

The Jesus Lizard chronology
Shot (1996)	The Jesus Lizard (1998)	Blue (1998)

Professional ratings
Review scores
Source	Rating
AllMusic	2.5/5 stars
Pitchfork	5.2/10

The Jesus Lizard is the third EP by the Jesus Lizard. It was released in 1998 on Jetset Records. The album features songs produced by Andy Gill, Jim O'Rourke and former The Velvet Underground member John Cale. It is their only LP or EP release without a four-letter title.

== Track listing ==
1. "Cold Water" - 2:49
2. "Inflicted by Hounds" - 3:30
3. "Eyesore" - 2:47
4. "Valentine" - 4:23
5. "Needles for Teeth" - 3:48
