= The Jesus Lizard =

American alternative rock band

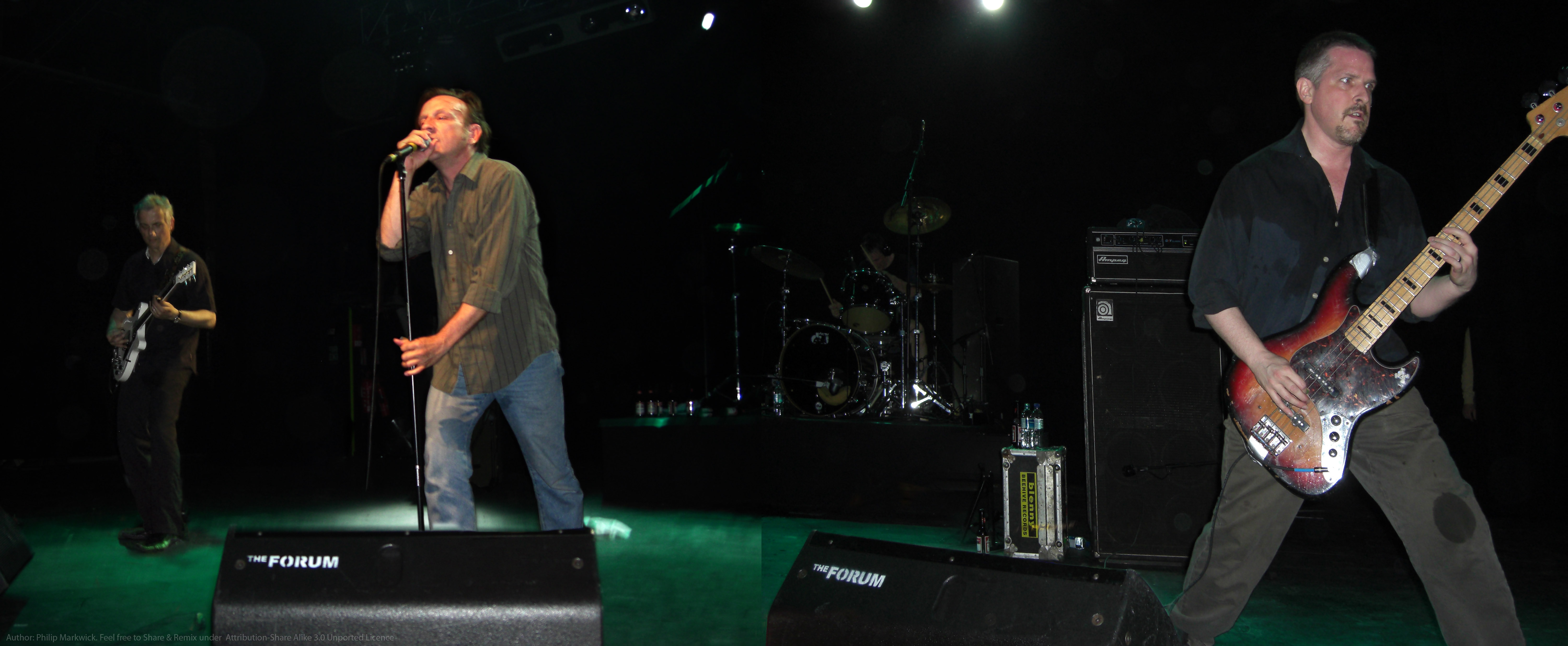
- The Jesus Lizard in 2009

Background information
- Origin: Austin, Texas, U.S.
- Genres: Noise rock; post-hardcore; alternative rock
- Years active: 1987–1999, 2008–2010, 2017–present
- Labels: Touch and Go, Capitol, Ipecac
- Members: David Yow; David Wm. Sims; Duane Denison; Mac McNeilly
- Past members: Jim Kimball; Brendan Murphy

The Jesus Lizard is an American rock band formed in 1987 in Austin, Texas by vocalist David Yow, guitarist Duane Denison, and bassist David Wm. Sims. They relocated to Chicago in 1989 and began working with producer Steve Albini and Touch and Go Records. Adding drummer Mac McNeilly, they became "a leading noise rock band in the American independent underground…[who] turned out a series of independent records filled with scathing, disembowelling, guitar-driven pseudo-industrial noise." The albums Goat (1991) and Liar (1992) have since been recognized as two of the most significant noise rock albums of the era.

Drummer Jim Kimball replaced McNeilly late in 1996 and was himself replaced by Brendan Murphy two years later. Despite releasing a split single with leading alt-rockers Nirvana and signing to Capitol Records, the band did not achieve commercial success amid the alternative rock explosion of the 1990s and disbanded in 1999. With returning drummer McNeilly, their reunion tour ten years later garnered positive responses from audiences and critics. They performed further reunion tours beginning in 2017.

== History ==
=== Formation and Touch and Go years (1987–1994) ===
The band began in Austin, Texas, when guitarist Duane Denison asked David Yow, formerly of Scratch Acid, to play bass on some songs he wanted to record. Yow suggested that he sing and have former Scratch Acid bassist David Wm. Sims play bass instead. The resultant group took its name from a common nickname for the basilisk, a type of lizard that can run on water. The trio rehearsed several times in Austin with a drum machine. Yow and Sims moved to Chicago in 1988, and Denison followed the next year.

Their first EP, Pure, was recorded by Albini and released by Touch and Go Records in 1989. It is the only record by the band that uses a drum machine. Drummer Mac McNeilly, formerly of Phantom 309, was recruited and the band played its first live show on July 1, 1989. Albini recorded the band's next four albums – Head (1990), Goat (1991), Liar (1992), and Down (1994). During this era the group also released a live record, Show, and a split single with Nirvana, "Puss / Oh, the Guilt".

=== Capitol years and breakup (1995–1999) ===
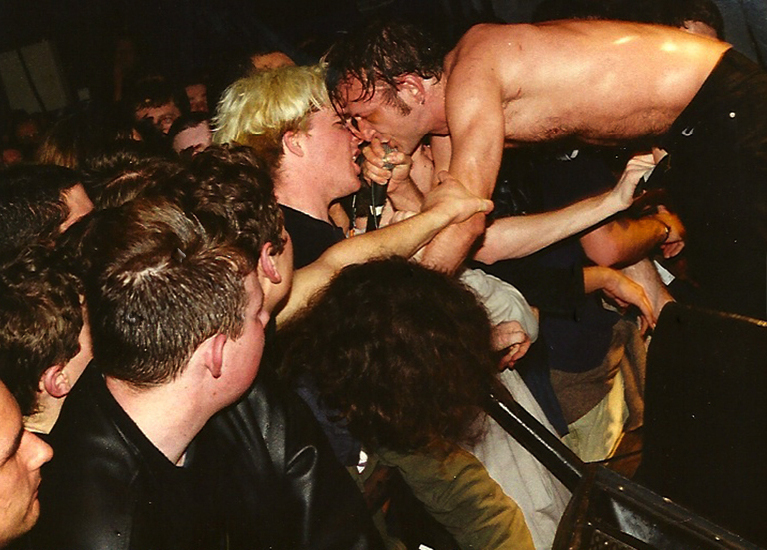
The Jesus Lizard performing at The Garage at London circa 1998

The band signed to Capitol Records in 1995, recording the song "Panic in Cicero" for the Clerks soundtrack and making appearances at Lollapalooza shortly thereafter. Impressed by his work on the Melvins' Stoner Witch album, the band hired producer Garth Richardson to record their next record, Shot, the following year. While rumors that Albini refused to work with the band due to their involvement with a major label persisted, both Albini and the group have stated this to be false.

McNeilly left the band in late 1996, citing exhaustion from touring and the desire to spend more time with his family. He was replaced by Jim Kimball, of Mule and Denison's side project, the Denison/Kimball Trio.

After more heavy touring the following year, this lineup recorded 1998's self-titled EP, their only record whose title is not a four-letter word, on Jetset Records. The EP featured production and engineering by Andy Gill of Gang of Four, John Cale, and Jim O'Rourke. Later that year, the band released the album Blue, also recorded by Gill. A departure, the record explored their experimental instincts previously hinted at on earlier songs like "Happy Bunny Goes Fluff-Fluff Along" and "White Hole".

In August 1998 Kimball left the group and was replaced by Chicago-based drummer Brendan Murphy, formerly of the Wesley Willis Fiasco. They embarked on several more months of heavy touring, playing the final gig of their initial career at the Umeå Open festival in Umeå, Sweden, on March 27, 1999. After being dropped from Capitol Records mid-contract, the band announced its split the following June.

=== Post-breakup (2000–2007) ===
In 2000, Touch & Go issued Bang, a CD of 7" tracks and rarities. The members remained musically active: Denison began performing with Tomahawk, continued to play with Kimball in The Denison/Kimball Trio, and backed Hank Williams III on tour. In 2006, he also formed U.S.S.A. with bassist Paul Barker (ex-Ministry). McNeilly played drums in P.W. Long's Reelfoot recording "Push Me Again", and continued to play along with his wife in their band Mouse. He recorded with Steve Albini in February 2007 for Denison's Fuzz label mate Greg Garing.

In 2006, Yow and Sims reformed Scratch Acid, along with original members Rey Washam (also of Rapeman, Ministry) and Brett Bradford (also of Sangre de Toro) for the Touch & Go Records 25th Anniversary Festival in Chicago. A week before the Touch & Go Festival, the reunited Scratch Acid played to a sold-out crowd at Emo's in their hometown of Austin. Sims relocated to New York City, began working as an accountant, and maintained his solo project Dangerpuss. Denison relocated to Nashville. Yow moved to Los Angeles, working in graphic design for an advertising agency and joining the band Qui, before pursuing an acting career and briefly joining Flipper on vocals.

=== Reunion tour (2008–2010) ===
The Jesus Lizard reformed in 2008 with McNeilly drumming, and began playing concerts the next year. These shows included appearances at the Pitchfork Music Festival in Chicago, and All Tomorrow's Parties music festivals in England and New York. On October 6, all of the band's Touch & Go studio albums were re-released with improved sound and bonus tracks. The albums were remastered by Albini and Bob Weston and packaged with new liner notes and gatefold artwork. Following the tour, the individual members returned to other projects and stated that this run of activity was "probably [their] last."

=== Post-reunion tour (2010–2016) ===
In August 2011 MVD released Club, a concert DVD and double LP of the band's Nashville performance at Exit/In from the 2009 tour.

In 2013, Yow released Tonight You Look Like a Spider, a solo album that had been in production for almost 15 years on Joyful Noise Recordings. Yow stated that he'd been inspired to do the album by Mike Patton, and described his compositional process by stating, "I rented a saxophone for 2 months, I borrowed some guitars and some drums, I rummaged through the kitchen, I squeezed a fat cat, I poked and prodded and ended up with my very own music."

In October 2013, the Jesus Lizard was set to play at the All Tomorrow's Parties event Release the Bats in Melbourne, Australia. They canceled this show due to 'unforeseen circumstances'.

=== Second reunion and Rack (2017–present) ===
In September 2017, the band announced their second reunion. The band undertook their first tour in eight years that December. They went on a tour in September 2018 and would play Riot Fest 2018 in Chicago that same month. In June 2024, the Jesus Lizard announced their first album in 26 years, revealing the title to be Rack, simultaneously releasing the first single, "Hide and Seek", to streaming platforms. The album was released on September 13 through Ipecac Recordings. The band went on tour to play new material: their US and British concerts were praised by the press.

== Musical style and influences ==
Jesus Lizard's sound, with its scathing mix of piercing guitar, machine-like drums, propulsive bass guitar, and deranged vocals, has often been classified as noise rock. The band has rejected this label, however, with Mac McNeilly stating that, "I do not think we ever looked at ourselves that way, though. Rather, we were a band that played rock music under the big umbrella of rock." David Yow has described the band's music as "four white guys who liked to play a cross between Led Zeppelin and the Birthday Party." Other influences cited by the band include Magazine, Killing Joke, early Public Image Ltd, and Gang of Four.

Duane Denison's playing is influenced by British guitarists such as John McGeoch from Siouxsie and the Banshees and Magazine for his work on Juju in particular, Gang of Four's Andy Gill, Killing Joke's Geordie Walker, PiL's Keith Levene, and bands of the US underground scenes like Black Flag, Hüsker Dü, Butthole Surfers and Big Black. Denison said that he wanted to mix "the post-punk, minimalist thing with the more, ... esoteric, porgy vibe."

Albini typically kept vocals "low in the mix," or much less prominent than was typical of rock and roll recordings. In Our Band Could Be Your Life, Michael Azerrad writes that "on the Jesus Lizard albums Albini recorded, singer David Yow sounds like a kidnap victim trying to howl through the duct tape over his mouth; the effect is horrific." David Sprague suggests that "Yow's disjointed couplets" are reminiscent of a "preacher speaking in tongues." Yow doesn't consider himself a singer in the usual sense, but rather, thinks of himself as a vocal stylist. While appreciated as a unique vocalist, Yow was more often cited for his confrontational antics on-stage, often leaping into the crowd or taking off his clothes. He was also known to lick members of the crowd while climbing all over them and sometimes striking up conversation mid-song.

== Legacy ==
The band have been cited as an influence or a favorite by acts including Nirvana, OK Go frontman Damian Kulash, Gouge Away, KEN Mode, Bill Kelliher of Mastodon, Whores, Botch, Converge, Brand New, Chat Pile, METZ, Alexis Marshall of Daughters, Sara Lund of Unwound, Jim Suptic of The Get Up Kids, Jawbreaker, Johnny Temple of Girls Against Boys, Wes Borland of Limp Bizkit, Red Fang, Joe Lally of Fugazi, Henry Rollins, Helmet, and Lydia Lunch.

Albini described them as "the best band of the 90s, hands down ... They were a great band and they changed music for the better. Their music was more rigorous and more adventurous than all their peers, and they worked their asses off." However, he criticized their decision to sign to Capitol, a major label, saying it doomed them to "become a third-string act for a big corporation that didn't give a shit about them or their audience".

== Members ==
Current members

- David Yow – vocals (1987–1999, 2008–2010, 2017–present)
- Duane Denison – guitar (1987–1999, 2008–2010, 2017–present)
- David Wm. Sims – bass (1987–1999, 2008–2010, 2017–present)
- Mac McNeilly – drums (1989–1996, 2008–2010, 2017–present)

Former members

- Jim Kimball – drums (1996–1998; died 2025)
- Brendan Murphy – drums (1998–1999)

== Discography ==
=== Studio albums ===
- Head (1990, Touch and Go)
- Goat (1991, Touch and Go)
- Liar (1992, Touch and Go)
- Down (1994, Touch and Go)
- Shot (1996, Capitol)
- Blue (1998, Capitol)
- Rack (2024, Ipecac)

=== Live albums ===
- Show (1994, Collision Arts)
- Club (2011, Chunklet)

=== Compilations ===
- Bang (2000, Touch and Go)
- Inch (2009, Touch and Go)

=== EPs ===
- Pure (1989, Touch and Go)
- Lash (1993, Touch and Go)
- The Jesus Lizard (1998, JetSet)

=== Singles ===
- "Chrome" (1989, Touch and Go)
- "Mouth Breather" (1990, Touch and Go)
- "Wheelchair Epidemic" (1992, Touch and Go)
- "Gladiator" (1992, Touch and Go)
- "Gladiator" / "Boilermaker" (1992, Insipid Vinyl)
- "(Fly) On (The Wall)" (1993, Touch and Go)
- "Puss" / "Oh, The Guilt" (1993, Insipid Vinyl) (split single of "Puss" by the Jesus Lizard and "Oh, the Guilt" by Nirvana)
- "Puss" (1993, Touch and Go)
- "Mailman" (1996, Capitol)
- "Hide and Seek" (2024, Ipecac)

=== Official videos ===
- "Nub" (1991)
- "Gladiator" (1992)
- "Puss" (1993)
- "Destroy Before Reading" (1994)
- "Hide & Seek" (2024)
- "Alexis Feels Sick" (2024)
- "Moto(R)" (2024)
- "Fallimg Down" (2024)

=== DVDs ===
- The Jesus Lizard – Live (Music Video Distributors, 2007)
- The Jesus Lizard – Club (Music Video Distributors, 2011)

== Chart positions ==
Albums

Year	Album	Chart	Position
1994	Down	UK Albums	64
1996	Shot	US Heatseekers	28

Singles

Year	Single	Chart	Position
1993	"Puss/Oh, the Guilt" (split single with Nirvana)	UK Singles Chart	12
