= David Yow =

American singer (born 1960)

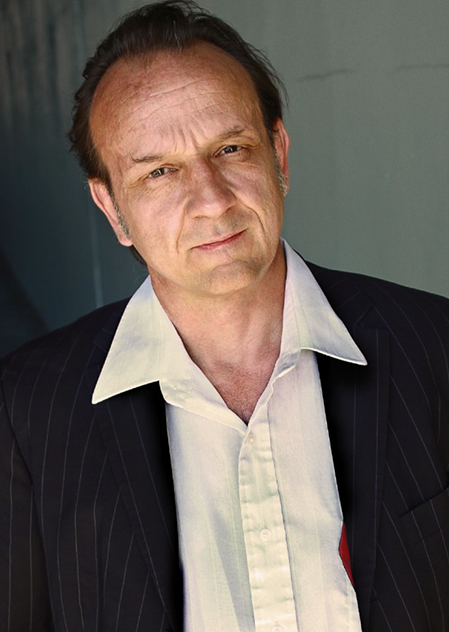

Background information
- Born: David Lambeth Yow; August 2, 1960 (age 66); Las Vegas, Nevada, United States
- Genres: Alternative rock; noise rock; post-hardcore
- Occupations: Musician, songwriter, actor
- Instruments: Vocals, bass
- Years active: 1982–present
- Labels: Joyful Noise Records; Rabid Cat; Touch and Go; Capitol

David Lambeth Yow (/ˈjaʊ/; born August 2, 1960) is an American musician and actor born in Las Vegas, Nevada and best known as the vocalist for the noise rock bands Scratch Acid and the Jesus Lizard. Yow's debut solo album, Tonight You Look Like a Spider, was released in June 2013 on Joyful Noise Records.

== Music ==
=== 1980s ===
In 1982, Yow formed the Austin, Texas–based punk/noise rock group Scratch Acid. The group's initial lineup featured Steve Anderson (vocals), David Wm. Sims (guitar), Brett Bradford (guitar), Yow (bass), and Rey Washam (drums). Anderson was kicked out of the band early in their career, prompting Yow to move to vocals and Sims to move to bass. After releasing three albums and developing a strong following, the group disbanded in 1987.

Yow and Sims next formed the Jesus Lizard in 1987 with guitarist Duane Denison. The trio relocated to Chicago, Illinois, in 1989. They used a drum machine for their earliest recordings and performances before adding drummer Mac McNeilly after recording their first EP Pure. Yow achieved wide notoriety for playing shows completely drunk and incoherent. Of touring with Jesus Lizard, Yow said: "I enjoyed writing songs and acting like an idiot with those guys to make enough money to support ourselves." The Jesus Lizard eventually landed a spot on the Lollapalooza tour and signed to Capitol Records, despite earning little commercial success. During the course of their career, the Jesus Lizard released six studio albums, three EPs and a live album before breaking up in 1999.

=== 1990s & 2000s ===
In 1995, Yow collaborated with Helmet on a cover version of "Custard Pie" for Encomium: A Tribute to Led Zeppelin.

In 2006, Yow, Sims, Washam and Bradford reformed Scratch Acid for the Touch and Go Records 25th Anniversary Festival in Chicago. They also performed a series of reunion shows in Austin, Chicago, and Seattle.

In late 2006, Yow officially joined the Los Angeles band Qui as a full-time member, after playing several shows as a guest. Of his two bandmates, Yow said: "Well, they're both just fucking brilliant, y'know? I have never in all my years in the music industry encountered two guys with more talent, more vision ... and who are as driven to greatness as these two are." On January 25, 2008, Yow was hospitalized in Pittsburgh with a collapsed lung, following a Wrekmeister Harmonies performance at the Andy Warhol Museum. He was released from hospital a few days later.

In 2008, the Jesus Lizard reformed with the classic lineup and embarked on several tours. They again lapsed into inactivity at the end of the following year.

=== 2010s & 2020s ===
His first New York solo art show opened at Fuse Gallery in August 2011 and ran until September 21, 2011. In 2013, Yow released a solo album that had been in production for almost 15 years on Joyful Noise Recordings. The album was titled Tonight You Look Like a Spider. Yow stated that he'd been inspired to do the album by Mike Patton, and described his compositional process in an anecdote:

I rented a saxophone for 2 months, I borrowed some guitars and some drums, I rummaged through the kitchen, I squeezed a fat cat, I poked and prodded and ended up with my very own music. It's real good, if you like that kind of shit. I named it Tonight You Look Like A Spider after a spider I saw one night.

In 2015, Yow performed two shows with Flipper, substituting for vocalist Bruce Loose who had to retire from live performance due to health issues. Yow reprised his role with Flipper for the band's 40th Anniversary Tour in 2019, with the shows being openly billed as Flipper with David Yow.

Yow has also appeared live with other bands, including Cop Shoot Cop, Shellac, the Dicks, the Melvins, Girls Against Boys and has contributed vocals to various albums and recordings by Helmet, Pigface, and others. Yow has appeared in two music videos for punk supergroup OFF!, 2014's "Hypnotized" (as a Hollywood street performer) and 2021's "Holier Than Thou" (as a corrupt Catholic priest). Yow also recorded a commentary track for Tool's DVD single "Schism" in 2005.

In 2026, Yow contributed vocals to a cover of Captain Beefheart's "Hot Head" by Orcutt Shelley Miller, and performed it and Scratch Acid's "Cannibal" with the trio at London's 100 Club in April of that year.

== Acting ==
Yow is an occasional actor. He has appeared in films including I Don't Feel at Home in This World Anymore, Southbound, Entertainment, Dinner in America, Under the Silver Lake, and Big Money Rustlas with Insane Clown Posse. Yow has also appeared on television shows, and had a major role on the 2022 show Bring On the Dancing Horses.

== Personal life ==
According to his close friend and recording engineer Steve Albini, Yow is an accomplished cook and has worked in several restaurants in Austin and Chicago. Yow also has an extensive resume of graphic design work. He is known in his field for retouching photographs and is a former employee of Upshot, an advertising agency.

Yow is an avid cat lover and has drawn cats for the last 30 years. In 2014, Akashic Books released a compilation of Yow's cat illustrations called Copycat: And a Litter of Other Cats. Yow also interviewed Lil Bub for The A.V. Club.

== Discography ==
Studio albums

- Tonight You Look Like a Spider (2013, Joyful Noise)

== Filmography ==
=== Film ===
| Year | Title | Role |
|---|---|---|
| 1997 | Bullet on a Wire | Ed |
| 2007 | Jesus Lizard: Live | Himself |
| 2008 | Al's Beef | The preacher |
| 2010 | Big Money Rustlas | Piano Player |
| 2010 | Spiral | Dante |
| 2010 | Sunday Punch | Arthur |
| 2011 | Fully Loaded | David the bartender |
| 2013 | All Roads Lead | Paul Keller |
| 2013 | The Funtime Gang | Dad |
| 2013 | Resurrection Slope | David |
| 2014 | Moments the Go | Tom |
| 2014 | Upsidedown Cross | Preacher |
| 2014 | Early Light | Weinberg |
| 2015 | Southbound | Danny |
| 2015 | Entertainment | Party host |
| 2015 | Too Late | Arthur |
| 2016 | Walden Pink | Walden Pink |
| 2016 | Bleed | Deputy Wilson |
| 2017 | I Don't Feel at Home in This World Anymore | Marshall |
| 2017 | High & Outside: A Baseball Noir | David |
| 2017 | An American Texas | Detective Crenshaw |
| 2018 | Under the Silver Lake | Homeless King |
| 2018 | The Fruits of Idle Labor | Father |
| 2019 | Rattlesnake | Charlie |
| 2020 | Dinner in America | Eddie Sorvino |
| 2020 | MetaVision | Gideon Moseley |
| 2020 | Mr Bungle: The Night They Came Home | Audience |
| 2021 | Off!: Holier than Thou | Preacher |
| 2021 | Martyrs, Badgers & Other Rodents | Human transition host |
| 2022 | Spoonful of Sugar | Roger |
| 2022 | Seymour Ruck | Seymour Ruck |
| 2023 | The Toxic Avenger | Guthrie Stockins |
| 2023 | Free LSD | The boner doctor |
| 2023 | Suckling - Sisyphus | David Yowl |
| 2024 | Cover Your Ears | Himself |
| 2024 | Bliss | Pizza dude |
| 2024 | Dawn of Don Damage Vol. 1 | Chief Phillips |
| 2024 | A Desert | Harold Palladino |
| 2024 | Pull Over Right Here | Glen |
| 2024 | Still Life | The patron |

=== Television ===
| Year | Title | Role | Notes |
|---|---|---|---|
| 1994 | Mad Science | Mr. Rix | One episode |
| 2015 | Just Go with It | Uber driver | One episode |
| 2022—2023 | Bring on the Dancing Horses | French | Nine episodes |
| 2024 | The Skies Are Watching | Rodney | Five episodes |
