= Mac McNeilly =

American musician (born 1960)

- Born: Carey Folk McNeilly Jr; March 12, 1960 (age 66)
- Genres: Alternative rock; noise rock; post-punk
- Occupations: Musician, songwriter
- Instruments: Drums, bass
- Years active: 1983–present
- Labels: Touch and Go, Capitol

Carey Folk McNeilly Jr (born March 12, 1960), better known as Mac McNeilly, is an American musician, best known as the drummer for The Jesus Lizard. He also played drums in bands P.W. Long's Reelfoot, 86, Mouse, Come, Nadja, and played bass in Phantom 309. He is known for his very powerful, solid and hard-hitting style. McNeilly first appeared with The Jesus Lizard on the album Head, the band having previously used a drum machine. He was replaced by Jim Kimball late in 1996. He rejoined the Jesus Lizard for their 2009 reunion.
