= Jim Kimball =

American punk drummer (1965 or 1966 – 2025)

- Born: 1965 or 1966
- Died: August 27, 2025 (aged 59)
- Genres: Alternative rock; noise rock; post-punk; punk rock
- Occupations: Musician; songwriter
- Instrument: Drums
- Years active: 1980s–2025
- Labels: Capitol
- Formerly of: Laughing Hyenas; Mule; The Jesus Lizard; Firewater; The Denison/Kimball Trio

Jim Kimball (1965 or 1966 – August 27, 2025) was an American punk drummer. His earlier bands include noise-punk band Laughing Hyenas, Mule, and The Jesus Lizard, as well as The Denison/Kimball Trio (Kimball and former Jesus Lizard bandmate Duane Denison were the only members). Kimball and Kevin Munro left Laughing Hyenas to form Mule with Wig's P.W. Long in the early 1990s.

Kimball died on August 27, 2025, at the age of 59. He was the brother of Olympic silver medalist Bruce Kimball, who was convicted of killing two boys and injuring four others in a drunk-driving incident in 1988.
