= David Wm. Sims =

American musician (born 1963)

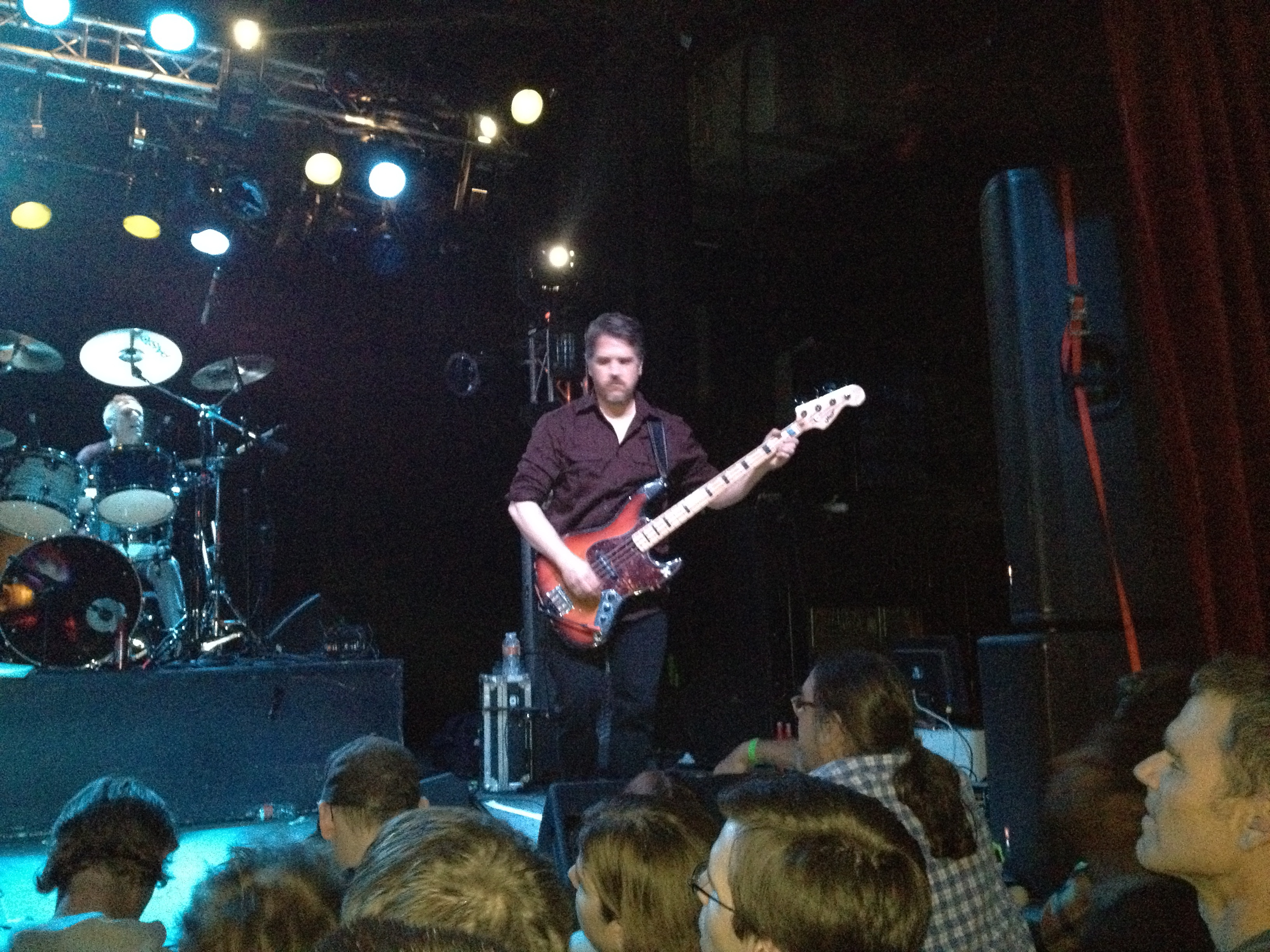
- with Scratch Acid on August 12, 2011

Background information
- Born: David William Sims; September 17, 1963 (age 62); Austin, Texas, United States
- Genres: Alternative rock; noise rock; post-punk; experimental; ambient; drone doom; post-rock
- Occupations: Musician, songwriter
- Instruments: Bass, guitar
- Years active: 1982–present
- Labels: Touch and Go; Capitol
- Member of: The Jesus Lizard
- Formerly of: Rapeman; Pigface; Scratch Acid
- Website: davidwmsims.com

David William Sims (born September 17, 1963) is an American musician, best known as the bass guitarist of the bands Scratch Acid (with whom he initially played guitar), Rapeman, and the Jesus Lizard. He has also recorded or performed with Sparklehorse, Rhys Chatham, Shivaree, Pigface, Flour, and others. Sims currently performs experimental solo electric bass as Unfact.

Sims was born and raised in Austin, Texas. His parents were an American-history professor and a nurse. Besides being a musician, Sims is a Certified Public Accountant and blogged on his personal website from 2008 to 2011, with only updates subsequently. In a Kreative Kontrol podcast in 2014, it was discussed that Sims "always had issues with the name" of Rapeman and that it was "the biggest musical regret" of his life. He lives in New York City.

== Solo discography (as Unfact) ==
- 2010 "Dead Wasp" 7" single (Ox-Ghost Recordings)
- 2010 "Bleached Valentine" - split LP with Noveller (Ox-Ghost Recordings/Saffron Recordings)
