= List of songs recorded by Tomahawk =

Tomahawk is an American-based rock band. From their formation in 1999 and up until 2014, Tomahawk recorded 53 songs. Numerous other artists also recorded under the Tomahawk moniker.

Three of the songs are singles, while the other fifty have appeared on one of Tomahawk's four studio albums.

== List of studio songs ==
Key
†	Indicates single release

Song	Number of times performed live^{[note1]}^{[note2]}	Release	Year	Refs
"I Can Almost See Them"	0	Oddfellows	2013	
101 North	87	Tomahawk	2001	
Aktion 13F14	0	Mit Gas	2003	
Antelope Ceremony	0	Anonymous	2007	
Baby Let's Play ____	25	Oddfellows	2013	
Birdsong	103	Mit Gas	2003	
Capt Midnight	68	Mit Gas	2003	
Choke Neck	5	Oddfellows	2013	
Cradle Song	0	Anonymous	2007	
Cul de Sac	4	Tomahawk	2001	
Curtain Call	0	M.E.A.T.	2014	
Desastre Natural	15	Mit Gas	2003	
El Tecolote	0	Sun Dance	2007	
Flashback	115	Tomahawk	2001	
Ghost Dance	0	Anonymous	2007	
God Hates a Coward	120	Tomahawk	2001	
Harelip	38	Mit Gas	2003	
Harlem Clowns	2	Mit Gas	2003	
Honeymoon	40	Tomahawk	2001	
I.O.U.	32	Oddfellows	2013	
Jockstrap	63	Tomahawk	2001	
Laredo	99	Tomahawk	2001	
Long, Long Weary Day	0	Anonymous	2007	
M.E.A.T. †	0	M.E.A.T.	2014	
Malocchio	2	Tomahawk	2001	
Mayday	109	Mit Gas	2003	
Mescal Rite 1	0	Anonymous	2007	
Mescal Rite 2	0	Anonymous	2007	
Narcosis	21	Tomahawk	2001	
Oddfellows	40	Odddfellows	2013	
Omaha Dance	0	Anonymous	2007	
Point and Click	121	Tomahawk	2001	
POP 1	87	Tomahawk	2001	
The Quiet Few	0	Oddfellows	2013	
Rape This Day †	65	Mit Gas	2003	
Red Fox	0	Anonymous	2007	
Rise Up Dirty Waters	4	Oddfellows	2013	
Rotgut	37	Mit Gas	2003	
Sir Yes Sir	58	Tomahawk	2001	
Song of Victory	0	Tomahawk	2007	
South Paw	28	Oddfellows	2013	
Stone Letter †	26	Oddfellows	2013	
Sun Dance †	0	Anonymous	2007	
Sweet Smell of Success	5	Tomahawk	2001	
A Thousand Eyes	0	Anonymous	2013	
Totem	19	Anonymous	2007	
Typhoon	2	Oddfellows	2013	
War Song	0	Anonymous	2007	
Waratorium	5	Oddfellows	2013	
When the Stars Begin to Fall	16	Mit Gas	2003	
White Hats / Black Hats	25	Oddfellows	2013	
You Can't Win	5	Mit Gas	2003	

== Live covers ==
Song	Original Artist	Number of times performed live^{[note1]}^{[note2]}	Refs
Angel Eyes	Various	35	
How Low Can a Punk Get	Bad Brains	19	
In Every Dream Home a Heartache	Roxy Music	38	
Just One More	George Jones	22	
Pay to Cum	Bad Brains	16	
Stalkin'	Duane Eddy	8	
Violence	Mott the Hoople	16	

== Other songs ==
Song	Number of times performed live^{[note1]}^{[note2]}	Refs
Improv	64	

== See also ==
- List of songs recorded by Faith No More
