= JD Wilkes & The Dirt Daubers =

American roots band

- The original lineup in 2009

Background information
- Origin: Paducah, Kentucky, USA
- Genres: Bluegrass; country; folk; hot jazz; blues
- Years active: 2009–present (on hiatus indefinitely)
- Labels: Arkam; Colonel Knowledge
- Members: JD Wilkes - Banjo, Harmonica, Piano, Kazoo, Vocals; Jessica Wilkes - stand-up bass, Vocals; Preston Corn - drums Rod Hamdallah - guitar
- Past members: "Slow" Layne Hendrickson - Gutbucket Bass, Vocals; Mark Robertson - stand-up bass

JD Wilkes & The Dirt Daubers are an American roots music band. The frontman for the band is JD Wilkes of the Legendary Shack Shakers.

== History ==
The group formed in Paducah, Kentucky in 2009. Their self-titled debut album was released on October 13, 2009, on Arkam Records. The album notes also give performance credits to label owner Jamie Barrier and Katie Barrier, both of The Pine Hill Haints. Barrier is also the great nephew of The Barrier Brothers bluegrass group.

The Dirt Daubers first performed at London's Raindance Film Festival, where Wilkes was showing his documentary film, Seven Signs. In the audience for that performance was Les Claypool of Primus, who approved and gave the group further confidence to continue performing and recording. They appeared on WRLT's Music City Roots program several times; programs that would later be rebroadcast on Nashville Public Television and syndicated nationally. In June 2010, Layne Hendrickson left to concentrate more on his job as a blacksmith, and the band performed several tours with Legendary Shack Shakers member/producer Mark Robertson on stand-up bass.

In 2012, the group reformed as "JD Wilkes and the Dirt Daubers" to record for Plowboy Records, the Nashville label run by Shannon Pollard, grandson of Eddy Arnold. After adding drummer Preston Corn and Shack Shakers' guitarist Rod Hamdallah, the group released Wild Moon. Several of their old-time tunes were reworked for the electric live set, including "Get Outta My Way" and "Sugar Baby".

== Musical style ==
The Dirt Daubers initially performed acoustic hot jazz, folk, old-time and hillbilly music. With the recording of Wild Moon, the band adopted electric instrumentation, shifting to a mix of styles which included jump blues, rhythm and blues, electric blues, rock and roll, rockabilly and country music.

== Discography ==
- The Dirt Daubers, 2009 (Arkam Records)
- Wake Up, Sinners, 2011 (Colonel Knowledge Records)
- Wild Moon, 2013 (Plowboy Records)
