= Wade Myers =

American psychiatrist

Wade C. Myers III
- Education: Stetson University, Temple University
- Occupation: Psychiatrist
- Organization: Brown University
- Known for: Studying juvenile homicide offenders and sexual homicide
- Title: Professor of Psychiatry and Human Behavior at Brown University
- Website: https://vivo.brown.edu/display/wm12#All

Wade C. Myers III is an American child and adolescent and forensic psychiatrist and a Professor and Chief of Forensic Psychiatry in the Department of Psychiatry and Human Behavior at the Alpert Medical School of Brown University. He is also a Director of Forensic Psychiatry at Rhode Island Hospital and the Medical Director for Newport Mental Health. Myers is distinguished for his studies of juvenile homicide offenders and sexual homicide.

== Education ==
Myers graduated from Stetson University with a Bachelor of Science in biology and from Temple University School of Medicine with a medical degree. He finished his residency in psychiatry at the University of Florida College of Medicine, his internship in general surgery at the University of South Florida College of Medicine, and fellowships in child and adolescent psychiatry and forensic psychiatry there as well.

== Career ==
Myers has held numerous positions at different institutions and has published over one hundred academic publications, including a book entitled Juvenile Sexual Homicide, which was published in 2002 under Academic Press. Additionally, he was a Professor and Chief of the Divisions of Forensic Psychiatry and Child and Adolescent Psychiatry at the University of South Florida Department of Psychiatry and Behavioral Medicine. Myers has been licensed to practice medicine in the state of Florida since 1984 and in Rhode Island since 2009.

Myers was also an expert witness during the sentencing phase of the murder trial of Rod Ferrell.

== Selected publications ==
- Myers, W. C., Husted, D. S., Safarik, M. E., & O'toole, M. E. (2006). The motivation behind serial sexual homicide: Is it sex, power, and control, or anger?. Journal of Forensic Sciences, 51(4), 900-907.
- Myers, W. C., & Blashfield, R. (1997). Psychopathology and personality in juvenile sexual homicide offenders. Journal of the American Academy of Psychiatry and the Law Online, 25(4), 497-508.
- Myers, W. C., Chan, H. C., Vo, E. J., & Lazarou, E. (2010). Sexual sadism, psychopathy, and recidivism in juvenile sexual murderers. Journal of Investigative Psychology and Offender Profiling, 7(1), 49-58.
- Myers, W. C., & Chan, H. C. (2012). Juvenile homosexual homicide. Behavioral Sciences & the Law, 30(2), 90-102.
