= Tonic Immobility =

2021 studio album by Tomahawk

Studio album by Tomahawk
- Released: March 26, 2021
- Length: 39:18
- Label: Ipecac Recordings
- Producer: Tomahawk, Collin Dupuis

Tomahawk chronology
Oddfellows (2013)	Tonic Immobility (2021)

Singles from Tonic Immobility
- 1. "Business Casual" Released: January 21, 2021; 2. "Dog Eat Dog" Released: February 26, 2021

Tonic Immobility is the fifth studio album by musical supergroup Tomahawk. Released after an eight-year gap following their previous record, Tonic Immobility was preceded by the singles "Business Casual" and "Dog Eat Dog". Described by guitar player Duane Denison as "an escape from the realities of the world", Tonic Immobility has been well received critically, particularly for its diverse-sounding songs, and has charted in several countries including Australia, Switzerland and the United Kingdom.

== Production ==
Coming eight years after their Tomahawk's previous album Oddfellows, and seven after the non-album single "M.E.A.T.", Tonic Immobility was recorded at the L429 Studios in Nashville, Tennessee, and the Vulcan Studio in San Francisco, California. Much of the music for the album was recorded three years before the vocals, while singer Mike Patton was working with other bands, including releasing The Raging Wrath of the Easter Bunny Demo with Mr. Bungle. Patton believed the music he received would have worked as an instrumental album, finding each of the songs to have already been evocative of a theme before he added any lyrics. Guitar player Duane Denison called the band's sound "cinematic rock", believing that the group—several of whom have worked in film scoring—benefit from a shared passion for soundtrack music; the song "Doomsday Fatigue" in particular was inspired by the mood of western films and had the working title of "High Noon".

Denison has described the songwriting for Tonic Immobility as having been inspired by current world events at the time, most notably the COVID-19 pandemic, stating "It’s been a rough year between the pandemic and everything else. A lot of people feel somewhat powerless [...] For as much as the record possibly reflects that, it’s also an escape from the realities of the world. We’re not wallowing in negativity". Patton stated that the song "Eureka" was inspired by his home town of Eureka, California, while "Doomsday Fatigue" drew from his experience of dwelling on negative news reporting during the pandemic, which left him "having a hard time getting off the couch and doing shit".

== Release ==
Tonic Immobility was released on March 26, 2021 through the Ipecac Recordings label; by CD, digital download, and several limited-edition vinyl LP editions. The album's release was preceded by the single "Business Casual", released on January 21, 2021. A second single, "Dog Eat Dog", was released on February 26, accompanied by a music video directed by Eric Livingston. The album débuted at number 1 in the UK Independent Album Breakers Charts, and number 5 in the UK Rock & Metal Album Chart, at number 18 in Australia's ARIA Charts, and number 34 in the Swiss Hitparade.

== Reception ==
Tonic Immobility has received positive reviews from music critics, with a weighted average score of 77% on Metacritic based on seven critics' opinions, indicating "generably favorable reviews". Kerrang! magazine's Angela Davey rated the album 4 out of 5, describing it as "40 minutes of pure, undiluted chaos". Davey highlighted the album's diverse-sounding songs, although noted that this meant the album did not sound particularly cohesive when played from start to finish. Alec Chillingworth's review for Louder Sound called the record Tomahawk's "most immediate, raucous record to date". Chillingworth also praised the breadth of styles across the album, summing it up as "premium Patton, his band playing from the heart rather than to the crowd".

Justin Velluci's review for PopMatters called Tonic Immobility "a true curveball", complimenting Tomahawk's decision to expand their sound compared to previous albums; writing that they do not "sound resigned to repeat the familiar tropes and traps of the past". The magazine would later rank it as the sixth best progressive metal album of 2021. Writing for Clash magazine, Ben Hopkins rated the album eight out of ten, calling it "a consistently immersive pull into a world that you don’t want to be in, but that you can’t quite escape". Hopkins felt that Denison's guitar work was the driving force behind the album's sound, comparing it to the mood of a David Lynch film and noting that it spans several genres across the length of the record.

== Track listing ==
All tracks written by Tomahawk

No.	Title	Length
1.	"SHHH!"	3:14
2.	"Valentine Shine"	3:01
3.	"Predators and Scavengers"	2:57
4.	"Doomsday Fatigue"	3:29
5.	"Business Casual"	3:29
6.	"Tattoo Zero"	3:18
7.	"Fatback"	3:14
8.	"Howlie"	4:08
9.	"Eureka"	2:03
10.	"Sidewinder"	3:54
11.	"Recoil"	3:27
12.	"Dog Eat Dog"	3:05
Total length:		39:18

== Personnel ==
- Mike Patton – vocals
- Trevor Dunn – bass guitar
- Duane Denison – guitars, keyboards
- John Stanier – drums
