= Hammer and tongs =

To go at something hammer and tongs is an idiom indicating seriousness of intent and capability of harm.

Hammer and Tongs may refer to:

== Books ==
- Hammer and Tongs, a seminal 1937 chapbook of essays by Clyde F. Beck in the field of science fiction studies
- Hammer and Tongs, 1999 poetry anthology featuring Karen Solie among others

== Music ==
- Hammer & Tongs, a British film production duo
- Hammer and Tongs, a 1989 album by the Scottish rock group Goodbye Mr Mackenzie
- Hammer and Tongs, a 1930 film; see screenwriter Douglas Z. Doty
- "Hammer and Tongs", a song by Budgie from the 1974 album In for the Kill!
- "Hammer and Tongs", a song by the Legendary Shack Shakers from the 2010 album AgriDustrial
- "Hammer and Tongs", a song by The Darkness from the 2015 album Last of Our Kind
