= Swampblood =

Studio album by Legendary Shack Shakers
- Released: 2007
- Recorded: 2007, Stainless Sound, Nashville, Tennessee
- Genres: Alternative country; country blues; swamp rock
- Length: 32:53
- Label: YepRoc
- Producers: Mark Robertson; J.D. Wilkes

Legendary Shack Shakers chronology
Lower Broad Lo-Fi (2007)	Swampblood (2007)	AgriDustrial (2010)

Swampblood is the sixth studio album by American rock band Legendary Shack Shakers. It is the third and final entry in the band's "Tentshow Trilogy" of albums, after Believe (2004) and Pandelirium (2006).

== Musical style ==
According to AllMusic, the Legendary Shack Shakers "continue to expand their musical palette" with Swampblood, writing that "the Tennessee hell-raisers have added a healthy portion of classic swamp rock to the menu", comparing the title track's style to the music of Tony Joe White, "Old Spur Line" to Slim Harpo, and "Hellwater" to Creedence Clearwater Revival. Hybrid magazine said that Swampblood "continues to purvey that classic country blues with a bayou twist" that the band is known for, but branches out beyond this style "with alternative forms of alternative country music, all the while maintaining their distinctive sound".

Swampblood is the final album in the band's "Tentshow Trilogy", preceded by Believe (2004) and Pandelirium (2006). The album completes the trilogy by following the themes and musical approach established in the preceding two releases.

== Reception ==
Professional ratings
Review scores
Source	Rating
AllMusic	3.5/5 stars

Andrew Gilstrap of popmatters.com rated the album at 7/10, commenting, "Swampblood finds the band in something of a high-octane back-to-basics blues mode". Embo Blake of HybridMagazine noted that the band, in this album, "maintain[ed] their distinctive sound and superb musical quality".

== Track listing ==
1. "Dawn" – 0:34
2. "Old Spur Line" – 3:47
3. "Hellwater" – 2:12
4. "Easter Flesh" – 2:16
5. "Swampblood" – 3:10
6. "Dusk" – 0:16
7. "Cheat the Hangman" – 1:36
8. "Born Again Again" – 2:18
9. "The Deadenin'" – 2:48
10. "Down and Out" – 3:11
11. "Jimblyleg Man" – 2:39
12. "He Ain't Right" – 2:10
13. "Angel Lust" – 1:55
14. "Preachin' at Traffic" – 1:38
15. "When I Die" – 1:14
16. "Bright and Sunny South" – 1:02

== Personnel ==
- Col. J.D. Wilkes – vocals, mouth harps, piano, organs, tape effects
- Mark Robertson – upright bass, bass guitar, baritone guitars, bgvs
- DavidLee – guitar
- Brett Whitacre – drums
- Steve Mabee – engineer, mixing

Guests

- Rich Gilbert – saw on "The Deadening"
- Jordan Richter – additional engineering on "Born Again Again"
- Paulie Simmons – drums on "Born Again Again"
- Steve Latanation – shaker, backing vocals
- Ward Stout – fiddle
- Fats Kaplan – mandolin on "Born Again Again"
- Kristi Rose – backing vocals on "Born Again Again"
- Jack Irwin – piano and organ on "Born Again Again"
