= M.E.A.T. =

Single by Tomahawk
- Released: May 23, 2014 (vinyl), June 4, 2014 (digital)
- Recorded: 2012
- Genre: Alternative rock, experimental rock, hard rock
- Label: Ipecac Recordings

Tomahawk singles chronology
"Stone Letter" (2012)	"M.E.A.T." (2014)	"Business Casual" (2021)

M.E.A.T. is a single released by the US musical group Tomahawk. It is a collection of two previously unreleased tracks from the Oddfellows recording session. It was first released on vinyl format on May 23, 2014 and was released digitally on June 4, 2014.

== Track List ==
No.	Title	Length
1.	"M.E.A.T."	2:54
2.	"Curtain Call"	2:21

== Personnel ==
Tomahawk

- Mike Patton – vocals, keyboards
- Duane Denison – guitar
- Trevor Dunn – bass
- John Stanier – drums, percussion

Additional

- Danielle de Picciotto – cover, design
