= Stone Letter =

Single by Tomahawk

from the album Oddfellows
- Released: November 23, 2012
- Recorded: 2012
- Length: 2:54
- Label: Ipecac
- Songwriter(s): Mike Patton; Duane Denison
- Producer(s): Tomahawk; Collin Dupuis

Tomahawk singles chronology
"Sun Dance" (2007)	"Stone Letter" (2012)	"M.E.A.T." (2014)

Stone Letter is a single by the American supergroup Tomahawk. It was released on vinyl and as a digital download on November 23, 2012. The song appears on Tomahawk's fourth album Oddfellows.

== Release ==
The band was originally going to release the track Waratorium as the lead single from Oddfellows, although it was later cancelled in favor of Stone Letter. Regarding why the song was chosen as the lead single, guitarist Duane Denison explained "‘Stone Letter’ was easily the most accessible, inoffensive sing-along-type song.... It seemed the most like other rock that is on the radio."

Denison also elaborated he hoped the song would earn the band new fans, saying "If we suddenly have a deluge of teenage girls [at our concerts] wanting to hear ‘Stone Letter,’ I’d love it."

== Music video ==
On December 3, 2012, the band released the music video for the song online, directed by Vincent Forcier. It is the band's first official music video from this album.

== Track list ==
No.	Title	Length
1.	"Stone Letter"	2:54
