= J. D. Wilkes =

J.D. Wilkes
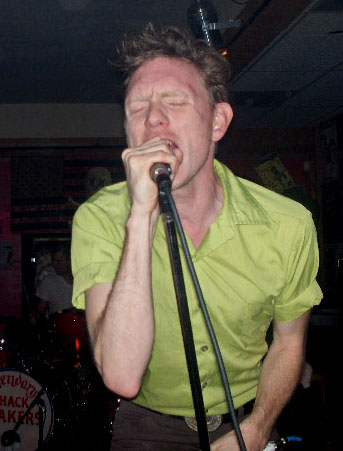
- Wilkes in 2007

Background information
- Born: April 18, 1972 (age 54); Baytown, Texas U.S.
- Genres: Rockabilly; blues; country
- Occupations: Musician; artist; filmmaker; author
- Instruments: Vocals, harmonica, banjo, organ, glockenspiel, piano
- Labels: YepRoc; Alternative Tentacles; Bloodshot; Colonel Knowledge; Arkam; Thirty Tigers; Big Legal Mess; Fat Possum

Joshua "J. D." Wilkes (born April 18, 1972) is an American visual artist, musician, amateur filmmaker and author. He is best known as the singer for the rock band Legendary Shack Shakers, and is also an accomplished harmonica player, having recorded for such artists as Merle Haggard, Sturgill Simpson, John Carter Cash, Mike Patton, and Hank Williams III in the American Masters film "Hank Williams: Honky Tonk Blues". His song "Swampblood" can be heard on the Grammy-nominated soundtrack for HBO's True Blood series. Wilkes is a resident of Paducah, Kentucky and is the author of two books, The Vine That Ate The South and Barn Dances and Jamborees Across Kentucky.

== Early life and education ==
Wilkes was born in Baytown, Texas. He holds a bachelor's degree in Studio Art from Kentucky's Murray State University.

== Career ==
Wilkes is known as the founder and only remaining original member of the Legendary Shack Shakers, a rockabilly and blues band he formed in Murray, Kentucky, in the mid-1990s. Before forming the band, Wilkes was a performer on the paddle-wheel boat, Paducah Jubilee. He also played harmonica for the neo-vaudeville act "Popularity Showboat". His first live, professional performance was with the group at the Kentucky State Penitentiary.

Regarding the Shack Shaker's "southern gothic" lyricism, Billboard Magazine said "[Wilkes writes] mind-blowing lyrics rife with Biblical references and ruminations of life, death, sin and redemption."

Wilkes is a Kentucky Colonel.

His contributions to the visual arts include many illustrations, comic strips, and sideshow banners. His satirical "Head Cheese" strip ran in the Nashville RAGE/Metromix weekly from 2005 to 2008. Other illustrative works by Wilkes have been published in Juxtapoz, Snicker, Mineshaft, ALARM Magazine, and TopShelfComix.com. Wilkes illustrated the book Spookiest Stories Ever for the University Press of Kentucky, released in 2010.

In October 2013, The History Press published Wilkes' book Barn Dances and Jamborees Across Kentucky, a history of traditional music get-togethers in the Bluegrass State.

In 2006, Wilkes, began work on a documentary film titled Seven Signs, that explored "music, myth, and the American South". The film premiered on December 30, 2007, at the Belcourt Theatre in Nashville, Tennessee and debuted in the UK at London's prestigious Raindance Film Festival. In early 2009, Wilkes formed The Dirt Daubers, an old-time roots-influenced side project with his now ex-wife, Jessica, and "Slow" Layne Hendrickson. The band's self-titled debut was released in October 2009. They were later referred to as JD Wilkes and the Dirt Daubers.

Occasionally, Wilkes and the Shack Shakers appear in the Danish theatrical production F.U.B.A.R., a production of Copenhagen's Mute Comp Theatre. The play, which tackles the subject of illegal gun trade around the globe, features a speaking part by Wilkes. He also reprised his "gothic preacher" character (developed for Shooter Jennings' The Real Me video) when he acted as the presenter at the 2013 Addy Awards in Cincinnati, Ohio.

In May 2014, Wilkes was selected by mayor Gayle Kaler to represent his home city of Paducah, Kentucky, in a cultural exchange with The Lord Mayor of Dublin, Ireland. Wilkes was met by author/actor/playwright and deputy Lord Mayor Gerard Mannix Flynn at the Mansion House in Dublin, where the two exchanged gifts as part of a UNESCO-sponsored reception.

In March 2017, independent publisher Two-Dollar Radio released Wilkes's novel The Vine That Ate The South, a book praised by NPR as "undeniably one of the smartest, most original Southern Gothic novels to come along in years". "Wilkes’ ability to spin a story and craft language that's as inventive and clever as the book's plot combine to create something special that's a bit of a contradiction itself—a book that feels both classic and new, mythic and modern".

== Discography ==
- J.D.'s Tasteless Chill Tonic, Legendary Shack Shakers, (1996, Conan Records)
- "Go Hog Wild b/w She's Gone Haywire" 45, Legendary Shack Shakers, (1997, Conan/Misprint Records)
- Hunkerdown With Those Legendary Shack Shakers, Legendary Shack Shakers, (1998, Spinout Records)
- Tomahawk, Tomahawk, (2001, Ipecac Records); harmonica on "Point and Click"
- Dressed in Black: A Tribute to Johnny Cash w/ Hank Williams III (2001 Dualtone Records)
- Sharp Dressed Men: A Tribute to ZZ Top w/Hank Williams III (2002, RCA Records)
- Cockadoodledon't, Legendary Shack Shakers, (2003, Bloodshot)
- Believe, Legendary Shack Shakers, (2004, YepRoc Records)
- Pandelirium, Legendary Shack Shakers, (2006, YepRoc Records)
- "No Such Thing b/w Born Again Again" 45 (2006, YepRoc Records)
- "Cock o' the Walk b/w Devil's Prayerbook" 45 The Dixiecrats (2006, Spinout Records)
- The Bluegrass Sessions, Merle Haggard (McCoury Music/Hag Records)
- Swampblood, Legendary Shack Shakers, (2007, YepRoc Records)
- The Dirt Daubers, The Dirt Daubers (2009, Arkam Records)
- True Blood Soundtrack Season One (2009, Elektra/Atlantic Records)
- Twistable, Turnable Man: A Musical Tribute to the Songs of Shel Silverstein w/Todd Snider (2010, Sugar Hill Records)
- AgriDustrial, Legendary Shack Shakers (2010, Colonel Knowledge/30 Tigers)
- Wake Up, Sinners, The Dirt Daubers (2011, Colonel Knowledge Records/30 Tigers)
- Kitchen Tapes, (2012, Arkam Records)
- Wild Moon, J.D. Wilkes and The Dirt Daubers (2013, Plowboy Records)
- Dump Road EP, Legendary Shack Shakers (2014, Arkam Records)
- Go Hog Wild/Tickle Your Innards 45, Legendary Shack Shakers (2015, Arkam Records)
- The Southern Surreal, Legendary Shack Shakers (2015, Alternative Tentacles)
- After You've Gone, Legendary Shack Shakers (2017, Last Chance Records)
- Fire Dream, Solo Album (2018, Big Legal Mess / Fat Possum Records)
- Cockadoodledeux, Legendary Shack Shakers (2021, Alternative Tentacles)

== Filmography ==
- Seven Signs (2007)
- BBC's Songs of the South (2015)
