= Cockadoodledon't =

Studio album by Legendary Shack Shakers
- Released: 2003
- Recorded: 2002–03, The Wagon, East Nashville, Tennessee
- Genre: Psychobilly; alternative country
- Label: Bloodshot
- Producer: J.D. Wilkes; Mark Robertson

Legendary Shack Shakers chronology
Hunkerdown (1998)	Cockadoodledon't (2003)	Believe (2004)

Cockadoodledon't is the third studio album by American rock band Legendary Shack Shakers. Released on April 22, 2003, the album established the band's presence on the alternative country scene.

== Musical style ==
The Houston Press categorized Cockadoodledon't as an "atomic psychobilly album". According to PopMatters, the style of Cockadoodledon't is defined by the Legendary Shack Shakers' detours from the album's overall sound, which The Cleveland Scene said sounded like "if Tom Waits, Southern Culture on the Skids, and the brain trust behind Ren and Stimpy holed up in Johnny Cash's country cabin with an ample supply of beef jerky and moonshine". AllMusic said that the album was defined by "horror-movie vocals by frontman 'Colonel' J. D. Wilkes straight out of the Lux Interior school and a hardcore, ragged combination of frayed blues, twisted bluegrass and ornery swamp". The Cleveland Scene wrote that "Cockadoodledon't is to rockabilly these days what the Reverend Horton Heat was in the early 1990s and the Cramps were in the early 1980s [...] Intimately connected to the rhythm of the blues, but hell-bent on destroying rockabilly's constricting boundaries and image". PopMatters wrote, "Even as the press release accompanying the album notes, Cockadoodledon't ain’t your typical alt-country. As a frame of reference they suggest imagining Iggy Pop fronting Southern Culture on the Skids [...] Their mastery over the 'old-timey' sound give them free rein to incorporate punk, blues, Southern rock and rockabilly into whatever psychotic stew they please." The Cleveland Scene said that guitarist JoeBuck's playing on the album showed him as a "learned disciple of Ennio Morricone and Link Wray."

"Bullfrog Blues" is a traditional song, while "Shake Your Hips" is a cover of a Slim Harpo song; the Legendary Shack Shakers' version incorporates the bassline from ZZ Top's "La Grange". "Blood on the Bluegrass" is based on Rod Ferrell, a self-professed "vampire", who at the age of 16, murdered the parents of one of his 15-year-old followers. According to PopMatters, this song resembles a murder ballad, in contrast to Wilkes' statement that the Legendary Shack Shakers "don’t do murder ballads, we do murder boogies".

== Reception ==
Professional ratings
Review scores
Source	Rating
AllMusic	3/5 stars

The album was reviewed by Stephen Haag of PopMatters.com, who concluded "All-at-once reverent, revisionist, greasy, and fun as hell, with summer upon us Cockadoodledon't should be the soundtrack to a thousand barbecues." Bob Gendron writing for AVguide stated "A mind-blowing assault on bluegrass rhythms, cowboy country, roadhouse blues, and sweaty rock and roll fury, Cockadoodledon't makes Reverend Horton Heat sound like The Eagles." Mojo magazine rated the album 3 stars out of 5 - "...Featuring fine ensemble work and blues harmonica. A real rush of blood to the head...". And Hal Horowitz, writing for AllMusic, said "The music is fun, frantic, and nerve-wracking."

== Track listing ==
1. "Pinetree Boogie"
2. "CB Song"
3. "Help Me from My Brain"
4. "Shakerag Holler"
5. "Hunkerdown"
6. "Clodhopper"
7. "Bullfrog Blues"
8. "Blood on the Bluegrass"
9. "Devil's Night Auction"
10. "Wild Wild Lover"
11. "Shake Your Hips"
12. "Hoptown Jailbreak"

== Personnel ==
- Col. J.D. Wilkes - vocals, banjo, harmonica, keyboards
- JoeBuck - guitar, banjo, mandolin, key accordion, upright bass, drums

Additional personnel: Mark Robertson, Paul Simmons, Donnie Herron, Jason Brown, "Handsome" Andy Gibson
