= Rod Ferrell =

American convicted murderer

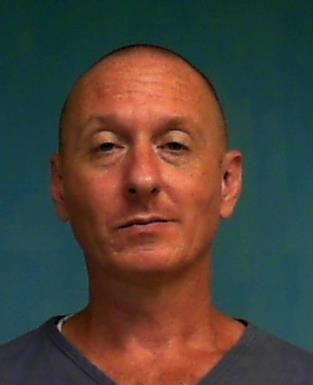
- Ferrell in a c. 2023 prison photograph
- Born: Roderick Justin Ferrell; March 28, 1980 (age 46); Murray, Kentucky, U.S.
- Other name: Vesago
- Spouse: Stephanie Ferrell
- Status: Incarcerated at the Marion Correctional Institution
- Convictions: Felony murder, burglary, armed robbery
- Penalty: Death, reduced to life without parole

Roderick Justin "Rod" Ferrell (born March 28, 1980) is an American murderer. He was a member of a loose-knit gang of teenagers from Murray, Kentucky, known as the "Vampire Clan". Ferrell claimed to be a 500-year-old vampire named Vesago, a character he created for himself after becoming obsessed with the role playing game Vampire: The Masquerade. It was his mother, Sondra Gibson, who first introduced this game to Rod. In 1998, Ferrell pleaded guilty to the double slaying of a couple from Eustis, Florida, becoming the youngest person on death row in Florida at that time. Originally sentenced to death, Ferrell's penalty has since been reduced to life imprisonment. In 2023, he married Stephanie Ferrell.

== Killings ==
On November 25, 1996, Naomi Ruth Queen and Richard Wendorf were found by their daughter Jennifer Wendorf, beaten to death in their Eustis home. While 49-year-old Richard Wendorf was asleep on his couch and Ruth was in the shower, Ferrell and accomplice Howard Scott Anderson had entered the home through the unlocked garage, picking up the murder weapon, a crowbar.

Before Richard awakened, Ferrell beat him multiple times with it, fracturing both his skull and ribs, almost instantly knocking him out, and killing him shortly thereafter. When Ruth found Ferrell and Anderson in the home moments later, Ferrell bludgeoned her to death, bashing her head with the crowbar. He claimed in his confession, however, that his original plan was to allow Naomi Ruth to live, but she first attacked him by lunging at him and throwing a scalding cup of coffee on him. This angered him and made him change his mind, so he killed her also.

Richard had burn marks in the shape of a V. It was said that the V was Ferrell's symbol, which he accompanied with a dot for each person he considered to be in his vampire cult.

The victims were the parents of Heather Wendorf, a long-time friend of Ferrell's whom he was helping to run away from a home that she described as "hell." Heather and the other girls that were with Ferrell and Anderson were not at the Wendorf home when the murders took place. Charity Keesee and her friend Dana Cooper had driven Heather to her boyfriend's apartment so Heather could say goodbye before leaving for New Orleans, leaving Ferrell and Anderson outside the Wendorf home.

After four days of driving through four states, the group was found in Baton Rouge, Louisiana. It is believed that Ferrell liked a video arcade in New Orleans, so they were headed there. One of the girls, Charity Keesee, placed a call to her grandmother in South Dakota. The group needed money, and Charity thought her grandmother could help them. However, Keesee's grandmother informed the police about her whereabouts and helped them trick Ferrell, Wendorf, and the rest of the teens into going to a local Howard Johnson's hotel, where they were arrested by waiting law enforcement. The four were held at a Baton Rouge jail for a week before being extradited back to Florida, where they were initially booked at the Lake County Jail. They were later moved to a juvenile facility in Ocala.

== Legal proceedings ==
On February 12, 1998, then-seventeen-year-old Ferrell pleaded guilty to the murders, claiming that the others traveling with him were innocent except Scott Anderson, who was simply an accessory. Ferrell pleaded guilty to two counts of felony murder.

His attorneys tried to argue that he was insane; he has been diagnosed with mental disorders including schizotypal personality disorder and Asperger syndrome. The University of Florida further attested that Rod sometimes witnessed spiritual things, such as angels and demons.

Judge Jerry T. Lockett sentenced Ferrell to death. Charity Keesee was convicted of two counts of third-degree murder, robbery with a gun or deadly weapon, and burglary armed with a weapon or explosives. She was sentenced to 10.5 years in state prison. Dana Cooper was convicted of those charges as well but was given a 17.5 year prison sentence. Anderson was convicted of the same charges as Ferrell and was sentenced to life in prison.

For two years, Ferrell held the record as the youngest inmate on death row. This changed in November 2000 when the Florida Supreme Court reduced his sentence to life in prison. Keesee was released from prison in March 2006, and Cooper was released from prison in October 2011.

In January 2013, an appellate court dismissed attempts by Ferrell and Howard Scott Anderson to get a new sentencing hearing. However, in December 2018, Howard Scott Anderson was resentenced by circuit judge Don Briggs to 40 years in prison. Anderson was given credit for the 22 years he has already served, making him first eligible for release in 2031.

Ruth Wendorf's relatives attended Anderson's resentencing hearing and did not oppose his early release. Speaking with the Daily Commercial, they said they are more concerned about Ferrell, who was scheduled for his own resentencing hearing in July 2019. Ferrell's hearing was subsequently rescheduled for November 18 and then again to April 2020, when the sentencing judge upheld his life without parole sentence and deemed him irreparably corrupt.

Anderson is currently incarcerated in the Calhoun Correctional Institution while Ferrell is in the Northwest Florida Reception Center Annex.

== Family life ==
Rod Ferrell was born to teenage parents in Murray, Kentucky in 1980. Shortly after his birth, his father left to join the military. His mother, Sondra Gibson raised him, moving back and forth between Florida with Sondra's parents and Murray, Kentucky. Public housing is where they would stay when not living in Florida. According to court testimonies, Rod claims that he was raped at the age of 5 by his grandfather. While these claims are in court records, no official charges were ever given. According to the Sun-Sentinel, when living in Kentucky, Sondra would support her and her son by working as an exotic dancer. She would also occasionally dabble in sex work. In an interview with the Orlando Sentinel, Sondra Gibson said she had taken part in vampirism. A member of the Vampire Clan's 14-year-old brother received letters from Sondra saying she would be his bride for eternity as a part of a vampire family. Weeks after the original death sentence, Ferrell's case Judge would say, "I think you are a very disturbed man. I think your family failed you…". The judge also stated that he thinks that his mother should also be on trial for introducing him to vampirism.

== Before the murders ==
Leading up to before the murders, Rod Ferrell and his group of "vampire" clan members would meet at an abandoned cement structure pinned "Vampire Hotel". This building is located in the middle of the woods in an area called Land Between the Lakes. These meetings would often include things like drinking each other's blood as well as other death rituals. Although no crimes have been proven to take place here, it is the most likely place where the murders were plotted.

== In the media ==
- The 1998 Anglia Television TV crime documentary Kentucky Teenage Vampires is about Ferrell and his clan.
- The 2002 film Vampire Clan is based on and named after Ferrell's cult.
- The 2003 Legendary Shack Shakers song "Blood on the Bluegrass", from their album Cockadoodledon't, is about Ferrell.
- Season 4, episode 8 of the series Killer Kids (aired in 2015) includes a half-hour segment on Rod Ferrell and his vampire clan.
- The UnXplained is a documentary series hosted by William Shatner which includes an episode featuring Ferrell as episode 15 of its first season ("Vampires and Werewolves", aired April 18, 2020).

== See also ==
- List of United States death row inmates
