= Believe (Th' Legendary Shack Shakers album) =

Studio album by Legendary Shack Shakers
- Released: 2004
- Recorded: 2004, Roswell East Studios, Nashville, Tennessee
- Genre: Cowpunk; psychobilly
- Length: 35:01
- Label: YepRoc
- Producer: J.D. Wilkes; Mark Robertson

Legendary Shack Shakers chronology
Cockadoodledon't (2003)	Believe (2004)	Pandelirium (2006)

Believe is the fourth studio album by American rock band Legendary Shack Shakers, released in 2004. This album, along with Pandelirium (2006) and Swampblood (2007), form a trilogy of albums referred to as the "Tentshow Trilogy" by the band.

== Musical style ==
According to AllMusic, Believe sees the Legendary Shack Shakers "adding a few more flavors to their usual gumbo of country, blues, rockabilly, and punk". Pitchfork felt that the album was "Southern Baptist imagery meets klezmer/rockabilly" and described the album's music as "cowpunk/psychobilly that deals in quasi-religious/sacreligious [sic] vagaries". PopMatters wrote regarding the album's style, "No doubt some bluegrass or rockabilly purists will find Believe's hyper-menacing flirtations to be sacrilege, but that’s kind of the point. To hell with traditions and placated expectations! This ain’t yer daddy’s rockabilly."

Believe, along with Pandelirium (2006) and Swampblood (2007), form a trilogy of albums referred to as the "Tentshow Trilogy" by the band.

== Reception ==
Professional ratings
Review scores
Source	Rating
Allmusic	4/5 stars

Believe was favourably reviewed by Zeth Lundy of PopMatters, who concluded, "The next time you take the O Brother, Where Art Thou? soundtrack from the stereo, pining for some oomph to your Americana, reach for Th’ Legendary Shack Shakers. “Colonel” J.D. Wilkes calls himself a jumpin’ jimdaddy, and before long, you will too." Ben Donnelly of Dusted magazine reviewed the album and commented that "Translating this band's strengths to record will probably always be a challenge. ... Still, they make the most of the challenge."

== Track listing ==
All songs written by J. D. Wilkes except where noted

1. "Agony Wagon" – 2:57
2. "Creek Cats" – 3:21
3. "Where's the Devil... When You Need Him?" – 2:59
4. "Piss and Vinegar" – 2:46
5. "County of Graves" – 3:45
6. "All my Life to Kill" – 3:03
7. "Cussin' in Tongues" – 2:45
8. "Help Me" – 3:47 (Sonny Boy Williamson II)
9. "Bible Cyst" – 2:55
10. "The Pony to Bet on" – 3:28
11. "Fistwhistle Boogie" – 2:22
12. "Misery Train" – 1:01

== Personnel ==
- J.D. Wilkes - vocals, Harmonica, piano, Wurlitzer Piano, Toy Piano, Wind-up monkey, See 'n Say
- Mark Robertson - Guitar, Double Bass, Bass guitar
- Paulie Simmons - drums
- DavidLee - Acoustic Guitar, electric guitar

Additional personnel include: Jordan Richter, Nick Kane (guitar), Fats Kaplan (banjo, fiddle, accordion), Donnie Herron (fiddle), Jim Hoke (clarinet, saxophone).
