= U.S.S.A. =

- Origin: Nashville, Tennessee, US
- Genres: Post-punk, alternative rock, minimalistic
- Years active: 2006–present
- Label: Fuzz
- Members: Paul Barker; Duane Denison; Gary Call; Johnny Rabb
- Website: ussa.fuzz.com

U.S.S.A. are a rock band formed by bassist Paul Barker and guitarist Duane Denison. After their initial collaboration, Barker and Denison recruited vocalist Gary Call and drummer Johnny Rabb.

Their first album, The Spoils, was recorded in the fall of 2006 and released on September 18, 2007.

This band is not related to the mid-1980s Chicago area band named U.S.S.A., consisting of former members of Montrose, Cheap Trick, Off Broadway, Pezband, and d'Thumbs.
