= Pandelirium =

Studio album by Legendary Shack Shakers
- Released: 2006
- Recorded: 2005
- Studio: Roswell East Studios, Nashville, Tennessee
- Length: 32:50
- Label: Yep Roc
- Producer: Mark Robertson; J. D. Wilkes

Legendary Shack Shakers chronology
Believe (2004)	Pandelirium (2006)	Lower Broad Lo-Fi (2007)

Pandelirium is the fifth studio album by American rock band Legendary Shack Shakers. It is the second album in the band's "Tentshow Trilogy", which began with Believe (2004) and concluded with Swampblood (2007).

== Musical style ==
J.D. Wilkes described Pandelirium as "carnival music played by a stripped-down blues band." The album was described by AllMusic as a further departure from the band's established style than their previous album, displaying a "more European, even Gypsy approach" that mixes "American and European goth sensibilities with the musty roots of country and blues along with the live-fast, die-young energy of early rock." J.D. Wilkes described Pandelirium as the second in a trilogy of albums which started with Believe (2004) that form an "unfolding trilogy of new American Gothic" called the "Tentshow Trilogy" by the band, which concluded with Swampblood (2007).

Exclaim! wrote that Pandelirium evokes "an atmosphere of Screamin' Jay Hawkins with more of a sense of humour and a touch more psychobilly goth than overt voodoo creepiness." The A.V. Club wrote that "The Shack*Shakers underline and punctuate almost every song on Pandelirium to emphasize their dissociation from the Bloodshot/No Depression scene—it's far more Gogol Bordello than Uncle Tupelo."

== Reception ==
Professional ratings
Review scores
Source	Rating
AllMusic	3.5/5 stars

Kyle Ryan's review for The A.V. Club rated the album "B−" and commented that the band "fire on all cylinders on Pandelirium's first half, particularly in the nihilistic "No Such Thing," but the carnival theme occasionally gets tiresome thereafter". Sepiachord summed up its review of the record with one word: "DAMN".

== Track listing ==
1. "Ichabod!" – 3:15
2. "South Electric Eyes" – 2:46
3. "No Such Thing" – 3:34
4. "Iron Lung Oompah" – 3:10
5. "Bottom Road" – 2:07
6. "Somethin' in the Water" – 2:49
7. "Jipsy Valentine" – 3:29
8. "Thin the Herd" – 1:37
9. "Monkey on the Doghouse" – 2:01
10. "The Ballad of Speedy Atkins" – 2:19
11. "Bible, Candle and Skull" – 3:01
12. "Nellie Bell" – 2:42

== Personnel ==
- J. D. Wilkes - vocals, harmonica, accordion, piano, toy piano, organ, glockenspiel, jaw harp
- Mark Robertson - double bass, guitar, bass guitar, vocals, typewriter
- David Lee - guitar, vocals

Additional personnel:

- Jerry Roe - drums, percussion
- Paulie Simmonz - drums
- Cobra Joe - percussion
- Steve Latanation - vocals, percussion
- Rev. "Horton" Jim Heath - guitar
- Jello Biafra - backing vocals
- Jack Irwin - piano
- Fats Kaplan - fiddle, banjo
- Jim Hoke - baritone saxophone, bass clarinet
- Bill Huber - tuba, trombone
