= The Spoils (U.S.S.A. album) =

Studio album by U.S.S.A.
- Released: September 18, 2006
- Recorded: 2006
- Genre: Post-punk, Alternative, Minimalistic
- Length: 48:52
- Label: Fuzz
- Producer: Paul Barker; Duane Denison

The Spoils is the debut studio album by American band U.S.S.A. It was written and produced by Paul Barker and Duane Denison.

== Track listing ==
1. "Dead Voices" (4:26)
2. "Autumn Flowers" (4:11)
3. "Blue Light" (4:22)
4. "Cruel Beauty" (2:03)
5. "Middletown" (4:36)
6. "Summer Endless Summer" (5:04)
7. "Forget Yourself" (3:25)
8. "Cab Ride" (4:34)
9. "Peculiar Thing" (6:04)
10. "Sugarwater" (4:38)
11. "Wasteland" (5:31)

== Reception ==
Ben Lasman of CMJ New Music Monthly, in a negative review, wrote that the album "plays like a cleaned-up retrospective of modern rock cliches flooded with misguided cock-rock swagger". Comparing its sound to Faith No More, Stephen Seigel of Tucson Weekly called The Spoils less dissonant than expected but "no less thrilling for the lack of it". Writing in Boise Weekly, Brandon Nolta called it "edgy, sometimes creepy and never less than entertaining", though it may not appeal to fans of its members' former bands. Greg Prato of AllMusic described it as "both arty and exploratory" without being snobbish. Prato compared the sound to first generation post-punk bands, including Barker's own The Blackouts.
