= Anonymous (Tomahawk album) =

Studio album by Tomahawk
- Released: June 19, 2007
- Recorded: Nashville and San Francisco, United States
- Genre: Native American music, experimental rock
- Length: 41:32
- Label: Ipecac
- Producer: Tomahawk

Tomahawk chronology
Mit Gas (2003)	Anonymous (2007)	Oddfellows (2013)

Singles from Anonymous
- 1. "Sun Dance" Released: June 12, 2007

Anonymous is the third studio album by the musical supergroup Tomahawk. It was released on June 19, 2007, through Ipecac Recordings, the record label owned by the band's vocalist Mike Patton. Anonymous charted in Australia, Norway and the United States.

Recorded after the departure of bass player Kevin Rutmanis, the songs on Anonymous are based on Native American compositions researched by guitarist Duane Denison. The album has received mixed-to-positive reviews, being described as faithful to its source material. One single, "Sun Dance", was released to support the album.

== Production ==
Anonymous was recorded after the departure of Tomahawk's bass player Kevin Rutmanis, leaving a lineup composed of Mike Patton, Duane Denison and John Stanier. Denison and Stanier recorded their musical parts for the album in Nashville, Tennessee, before sending them to Patton in San Francisco to add vocal parts and samples; the resulting album was a mix of live studio recordings and overdubbed sounds. Due to the absence of Rutmanis, both Denison and Patton recorded bass tracks for the album; Patton's former Mr. Bungle bandmate Trevor Dunn filled this vacancy in 2012.

The songs on Anonymous are based on Native American compositions, which Denison had researched while touring Indian reservations with musician Hank Williams III. During that tour, Denison had listened to Native American rock groups and was disappointed "at how normal they sounded", having expected to hear music that was "more aggressive, spookier and more kinetic" than the Southern rock and country rock he had heard. Denison found transcriptions of traditional music, and based his work for the album on these—the title Anonymous is a reference to the uncredited composers of this source material. The original compositions were mostly written with one melody line—often for a nose flute—with a simple accompaniment such as hand clapping. As a result, Denison has said the group "took a lot of liberties, and filled in a lot of space", leaving much of the album newly composed around these simple frameworks. Denison has called Anonymous a "kind of a detour" from Tomahawk's usual sound, and described it as a concept album.

== Release and reception ==
Professional ratings
Review scores
Source	Rating
AllMusic	4/5 stars
The A.V. Club	B
Pitchfork	5.9/10
PopMatters	6/10
Sputnik Music	4/5 stars

Anonymous was released on June 19, 2007, through Ipecac Recordings, the record label owned by Patton and Greg Werckman. The album's release was preceded by a digital single, "Sun Dance", on June 12. The B-side to the single was the non-album track "El Tecolote".

Reviews for Anonymous have been mildly positive. Writing for AllMusic, Jason Lymangrover rated the album four stars out of five, calling it "undeniably a stunning musical exploration". Lymangrover compared the album to Frank Zappa's Apostrophe (') and Mr. Bungle's California, also noting similarities to Patton's other supergroup Fantômas. Sputnik Music's Andrew H awarded the album a score of 4 out of 5, calling it "arguably the best Tomahawk [album] to date". The review praised Denison's work on retaining a faithful Native American tone on the compositions, while still allowing the album to sound familiar as a Tomahawk recording. Andrew Earles of The A.V. Club rated the album a "B", finding Patton's vocals uncharacteristically subtle. Earles felt that the album's best songs were "Cradle Song", "Omaha Dance", and "Antelope Ceremony", but felt negatively about "War Song" and "Red Fox".

Pitchfork's Jason Crock gave the album a rating of 5.9 out of 10, calling it an "odd, headstrong little record". Crock felt that the group were respectfully faithful to the musical culture within which they were working, but described the resultant sound as resembling a film score more than a live band. Writing for PopMatters, Mike Schiller rated Anonymous 6 out of 10. Schiller felt that Patton's vocal work had an "air of non-commitment", but praised Denison's enthusiasm for the project, concluding that it might have worked better as an instrumental album. Schiller highlighted "Ghost Dance", "War Song" and "Long, Long Weary Day" as the best songs on the album. A review in CMJ New Music Monthly described Anonymous as "the real wampum", finding it to be a respectful tribute to Native American music.

== Chart performance ==
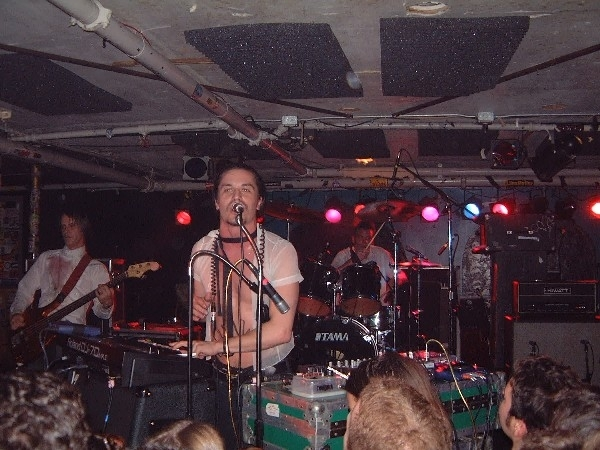
Tomahawk playing in Boston in 2001

In the United States, Anonymous reached a peak position of 158 in the Billboard 200 albums chart, spending only one week in the chart. Among the other charts published by Billboard, Anonymous attained a peak of 12 on the Independent Albums chart and 2 on the Top Heatseekers countdown, spending two weeks in the former and three in the latter. It also achieved a position of 13 on the Tastemakers chart, where it remained for one week. Anonymous also recorded chart positions in Norway and Australia, making it to number 31 on the VG-lista chart, and number 32 on the ARIA Charts.

Country	Chart	Peak position	Ref
Australia	ARIA Charts	32	
Norway	VG-lista	31	
United States	Billboard 200	158	
United States	Independent Albums	12	
United States	Tastemakers	13	
United States	Top Heatseekers	2	

== Track listing ==
All tracks are written by Tomahawk.

No.	Title	Length
1.	"War Song"	3:25
2.	"Mescal Rite 1"	2:53
3.	"Ghost Dance"	3:44
4.	"Red Fox"	3:04
5.	"Cradle Song"	4:11
6.	"Antelope Ceremony"	4:00
7.	"Song of Victory"	1:13
8.	"Omaha Dance"	3:57
9.	"Sun Dance"	3:02
10.	"Mescal Rite 2"	5:51
11.	"Totem"	3:04
12.	"Crow Dance"	3:45
13.	"Long, Long Weary Day"	1:23
Total length:		41:32

== Personnel ==
- Mike Patton – vocals, samples, keyboards, recording, engineering, production, mixing, album artwork, bass guitar
- Duane Denison – guitar, bass guitar
- John Stanier – drums
- John Baldwin – recording, engineering
- Jason Bullock – recording, engineering
- Ryan Boesch – additional editing
- Gavin Lurssen – mastering
- Martin Kvamme – album artwork

== Charts ==
Chart performance for Anonymous
Chart (2007)	Peak position
Australian Albums (ARIA)	32
Norwegian Albums (VG-lista)	31
US Billboard 200	158

== See also ==
- Music for The Native Americans, a 1994 album by Robbie Robertson
