= AgriDustrial =

2010 studio album by Legendary Shack Shakers

Studio album by Legendary Shack Shakers
- Released: April 13, 2010
- Recorded: 2009, Nashville, Tennessee
- Label: Colonel Knowledge
- Producer: Mark Robertson

Legendary Shack Shakers chronology
Swampblood (2007)	AgriDustrial (2010)	The Southern Surreal (2015)

AgriDustrial is the seventh studio album by American rock band Legendary Shack Shakers. Released on April 13, 2010, the album was the only release by the band to feature guitarist Duane Denison as part of the band's line-up.

== Composition ==
In 2008 Duane Denison joined the Legendary Shack Shakers, and the band shifted their sound, with Wilkes calling this new sound "agridustrial", explaining that it is "kind of chunky industrial patterns, but give it kind of a rustic feel [...] like the sounds of farm implements, that clanking cacophony of rural industry. Kind of like how Johnny Cash used a train rhythm." Chad Radford of Creative Loafing described AgriDustrial as "an album that mashes the rhythmic industrial plod of farmland industry with wide-eyed rock and roll".

== Reception ==
Professional ratings
Review scores
Source	Rating
AllMusic	4/5 stars

Chad Radford of Creative Loafing said that "distorted percussion and layers of ambient noise [...] make Agri Dustrial [sic] a masterpiece of experimental music."

== Track listing ==
1. "Melungeon Melody" – 0:34
2. "Sin Eater" – 3:13
3. "Sugar Baby" – 1:57
4. "Nightride (The Ballad of the Black Patch Riders)" – 2:36
5. "Dixie Iron Fist" – 2:31
6. "Two Tickets to Hell" – 2:57
7. "God Fearing People" – 2:56
8. "Greasy Creek" – 2:03
9. "Hammer and Tongs" – 4:04
10. "Hog-Eyed Man" – 1:54
11. "Dump Road Yodel" – 2:11
12. "Hoboes Are My Heroes" – 3:18
13. "Everything I Ever Wanted to Do..." – 2:43
14. "The Hills of Hell" – 1:42
15. "The Lost Cause" – 2:34
16. "Killswitch" – 0:42

== Personnel ==
- Colonel J.D. Wilkes – vocals, harmonica, banjo, piano, organ, Jew's harp
- Mark Robertson – slap and bowed upright bass, electric bass, guitar, background vocals
- Duane Denison – guitar, "prepared" guitar
- Brett Whitacre – drums and percussion
- Layne Hendrickson – percussion
