= Mit Gas =

Studio album by Tomahawk
- Released: May 6, 2003
- Recorded: 2003
- Genre: Hard rock; alternative metal; experimental rock; noise rock
- Length: 40:43
- Label: Ipecac
- Producer: Joe Barresi, Tomahawk

Tomahawk chronology
Tomahawk (2001)	Mit Gas (2003)	Anonymous (2007)

Singles from Mit Gas
- 1. "Rape This Day" Released: 2003

Mit Gas is the second studio album by the musical supergroup Tomahawk. It was released on May 6, 2003, through Ipecac Recordings, a record label co-owned by the band's vocalist Mike Patton (and his partner Greg Werckman). Mit Gas charted in several countries, reaching the top 20 in Norway's VG-lista and the United States' Billboard Independent Albums charts.

Recorded after an unreceptive tour opening for the band Tool, Mit Gas has been described by critics as a more focused and unified album than its predecessor, Tomahawk. The album was supported by a tour alongside Melvins, Skeleton Key, and Dälek. Mit Gas has garnered positive reviews, drawing comparisons to the works of Frank Zappa, Pink Floyd, and Led Zeppelin.

== Production ==
Tomahawk is a musical supergroup consisting of Mike Patton, vocalist for Faith No More and Mr. Bungle; Duane Denison, guitarist for The Jesus Lizard; Kevin Rutmanis, bass player for Cows and Melvins; and John Stanier, drummer for Helmet. Mit Gas was recorded after they toured with the band Tool, whose fans frequently booed Tomahawk off stage during their performances. Denison has likened the experience of playing to the unreceptive and uninterested crowds as similar to "being pro-choice at a [then-US president] Bush rally and trying to make your point". Subsequently, the band opted to organize their own tour in support of the album, choosing to work with Melvins, Skeleton Key and Dälek. Speaking about the planning required to stage a four-act tour, Patton stated "that's a lot of music. That's a lot of time to be sitting in some stinking-ass club with some guy puking in your purse". Tool's guitarist Adam Jones offered to direct a video, but the offer was declined by the band.

== Release and reception ==
Professional ratings
Review scores
Source	Rating
AllRovi	4/5 stars
Pitchfork	8.4/10
Spin	B−
Tiny Mix Tapes	4/5 stars

Mit Gas was released in the United States on May 6, 2003, and in the United Kingdom six days later, through Ipecac Recordings, the record label owned by Patton and Greg Werckman.

Reviews of Mit Gas have been positive. Writing for AllRovi, Daphne Carr awarded the album a rating of four stars out of five, adding that it "expand[s] the borders of guitar rock with intelligence and humor". Carr felt that "You Can't Win" and "Rape This Day" were among the album's best songs, and compared the overall sound to the work of avant-garde musician Frank Zappa. Pitchfork Media's Scott Hreha rated the album 8.4 out of 10, finding that the band seemed to complement each other musically more than they had on their previous album. Hreha singled out "You Can't Win", "Mayday" and "Rape This Day" as highlights of the record, and praised the album's ability to "straddle the distance between ambience and onslaught". Stephen Hang of PopMatters felt that the album was rewarding but challenging to listeners, and that Patton's lyrics were deliberately obtuse. Hang was positive about the album's sound, and described the release as having "deliver[ed] the goods for Patton's small, devoted cult audience".

Spin magazine awarded the album a "B−" rating, describing it as "heavy on nuts and bolts, light on bolts from the blue". The reviewer felt that the group's lineup suggested a greater potential than the resultant album offered, but called it "solid" nonetheless. Matt Rhodes, writing for Consequence of Sound, reviewed the album positively, stating that "frankly, this album sounds like dark, kinky sex". Rhodes compared it to the works of Pink Floyd and Led Zeppelin, and felt that Denison's guitar parts served to specifically complement Patton's vocals, rather than attempting to stand out for themselves. Tom Mallon of CMJ New Music Monthly felt that the album presented a more cohesive group than was present on Tomahawk, allowing the band to "[step] out of the shadows" of their previous careers. Mallon praised Patton's vocal performances, finding them to be his most diverse work since the 1999 Mr. Bungle album California.

== Track listing ==
All tracks are written by Tomahawk.

No.	Title	Length
1.	"Birdsong"	5:10
2.	"Rape This Day"	3:12
3.	"You Can't Win"	4:49
4.	"Mayday"	3:32
5.	"Rotgut"	2:51
6.	"Capt. Midnight"	3:10
7.	"Desastre Natural"	2:58
8.	"When the Stars Begin to Fall"	2:54
9.	"Harelip"	3:30
10.	"Harlem Clowns"	3:40
11.	"Aktion 13F14"	4:55
Total length:		40:43

== Personnel ==
- Mike Patton – vocals, keyboards, design
- Duane Denison – guitar
- Kevin Rutmanis – bass
- John Stanier – drums
- Joe Barresi – engineer, producer
- John Golden – mastering
- Martin Kvamme – design

== Chart performance ==
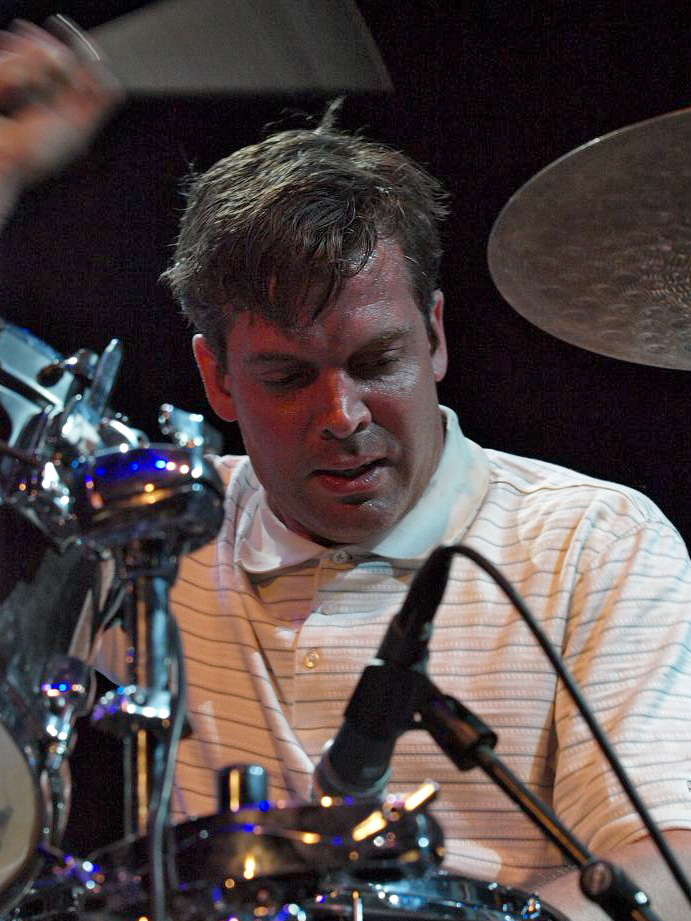
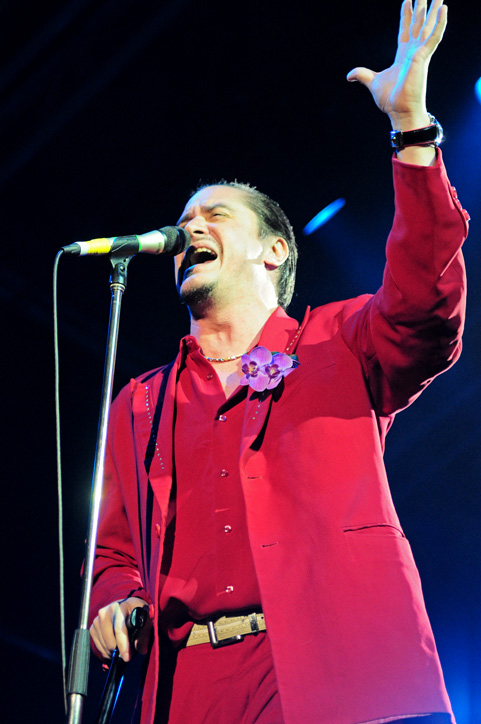
Left: John Stanier playing for Battles in 2008; right: Mike Patton on stage for Faith No More in 2010

In the United States, Mit Gas reached a peak position of 137 in the Billboard 200 albums chart, spending two weeks in the chart. The album also attained a peak of 7 on the Independent Albums chart, also published by Billboard, spending five weeks on that chart. The album also charted in Norway, making it to number 17 during a three-week stay on the VG-lista chart; and in Australia, where it reached number 28 on the Aria Charts, staying there for two weeks.

Country	Chart	Peak position	Ref
Australia	ARIA Charts	28	
Norway	VG-lista	17	
United States	Billboard 200	137	
United States	Independent Albums	7	
United States	Top Heatseekers	3	
