= Tomahawk (album) =

Studio album by Tomahawk
- Released: October 30, 2001
- Recorded: 2001
- Genres: Alternative rock; experimental rock; hard rock; post-hardcore; alternative metal; country rock
- Length: 42:19
- Label: Ipecac
- Producer: Joe Funderburk

Tomahawk chronology
Tomahawk (2001)	Mit Gas (2003)

Tomahawk is the debut studio album by American experimental rock band Tomahawk. Recorded after a meeting between vocalist Mike Patton and guitarist Duane Denison, the album features members of Faith No More, The Jesus Lizard, Helmet and Melvins. The band toured with Tool in support of the record.

Released on October 30, 2001, through Patton's record label Ipecac Recordings, Tomahawk has received positive attention from critics, with most appraisals drawing attention to the versatility of Patton's vocals. The album charted in both Australia and the United States, reaching a peak of number 20 in the Billboard Independent Albums countdown.

== Production ==
For Tomahawk, the band is composed of Mike Patton, vocalist for Faith No More and Mr. Bungle; Duane Denison, guitarist for The Jesus Lizard; Kevin Rutmanis, bass player for Melvins; and John Stanier, drummer for Helmet. Patton and Denison met in 2000 at a Mr. Bungle concert in Nashville, Tennessee, and began exchanging music. From there, the two began to jam together with a view to releasing an album. In a 2016 interview, Duane Denison stated "I wrote the basic tunes on my own (on a 4-track) and sent the cassettes (this was '99 -2000) to Mike, who then added vocals and samples for me to listen to. I think it took about a year altogether. We tracked and mixed live, altogether, in Nashville."

The band hired Joe Funderburk to produce the album; Funderburk had previously worked with Emmylou Harris and The Judds. The album was released through Ipecac Recordings, the record label owned by Patton and Greg Werckman. Ipecac is also home to Rutmanis' band Melvins, whose vocalist and guitarist Buzz Osborne had previously collaborated with Patton as a member of Fantômas. It was recorded in Nashville during mid-2001. Denison reflected "Being in Nashville seemed to bring out the worst in everyone--excessive drinking, anxiety, fighting, etc.....that's the chemistry!".

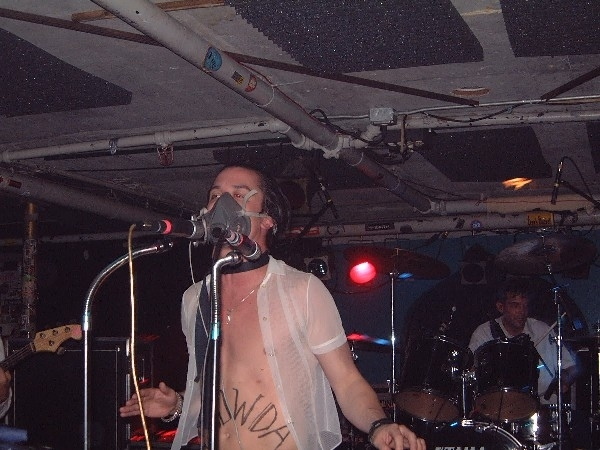
Mike Patton performing with Tomahawk in a gas mask in 2002, with John Stanier playing drums in the background.

Patton described the new group as "the closest thing to a rock band I've been involved with for a while". Regarding their name, Denison stated "It’s the kind of name an average kid says, “Hey TOMAHAWK is coming to town.” It sounds like it would be this hard, aggressive, typical nu metal band... and we’re not. There's some hard rock to it, but it's not typical. It's not wall to wall big riffs and kicking riffs. It's varied and the name can be deceiving."

== Release and reception ==
Professional ratings
Review scores
Source	Rating
AllMusic	4/5 stars
Boston Herald	3/4 stars
Drowned in Sound	8/10
Pitchfork	7/10

Tomahawk was released on October 30, 2001. The album was supported by a tour in which the band supported Tool; however, Tool's fans were unreceptive to Tomahawk and frequently booed their performances.

Writing for AllMusic, Blake Butler rated Tomahawk four stars out of five, describing the album as "moody, violent, beautiful, sarcastic, vomitive, silly [and] heartstopping". Butler praised Patton's versatility, calling the vocalist "a complete and utter musical visionary, and a mind-blowing and standard-warping genius". Pitchfork's Luke Buckman award the album a rating of 7 out of 10, similarly highlighting Patton's vocals as exemplary. Buckman called Patton "one of the greatest male vocalists around today"; and felt that "Flashback" and "Cul de Sac" were among the album's best songs. Mark Reed of Drowned in Sound rated the album 8 out of 10, noting the "wit" and "style" of the songwriting. Reed felt that the album was among the most conventional of those recorded by Patton, but still described it as featuring "supercatchy, earstretching vocals, dark lyrics rich in black humour, swathes of crunchy guitars and some of the most unusual rhythms to be played by human hands since time began".

Writing for the Boston Herald, Butch Lazorchak rated Tomahawk three stars out of four, finding that it "makes mincemeat out of the new-metal Johnny-come-latelies". Lazorchak described the album as having "an updated '70s hard rock approach that echoes Blue Öyster Cult at its sinister best", and found the opening song "Flashback" to be a "head-crushing pleasure". Reviewing a leg of the album's supporting tour for The Irish Times, Peter Crawley felt that "Sir Yes Sir" was a highlight of the album, due to Patton's "dark utterings" and Rutmanis' "drilling bassline". Writing for CMJ New Music Monthly, Dana Buoniconti compared the album to the soundtracks of David Lynch's film and television work—specifically likening "Honeymoon" and "Sweet Smell of Success" to the Twin Peaks theme. Buoniconti found Tomahawk to be "unsettling and unwholesome", but "thoroughly appealing".

== Track listing ==
All tracks are written by Tomahawk (Mike Patton, Duane Denison, Kevin Rutmanis and John Stanier).

No.	Title	Length
1.	"Flashback"	2:58
2.	"101 North"	5:13
3.	"Point and Click"	3:09
4.	"God Hates a Coward"	2:39
5.	"Pop 1"	3:25
6.	"Sweet Smell of Success"	3:41
7.	"Sir, Yes Sir"	2:09
8.	"Jockstrap"	3:51
9.	"Cul de Sac"	1:44
10.	"Malocchio"	2:42
11.	"Honeymoon"	3:07
12.	"Laredo"	4:16
13.	"Narcosis"	2:39
Total length:		42:19

Sampler
No.	Title	Length
1.	"Flashback"	2:58
2.	"God Hates a Coward (Excerpt)"	1:56

== Personnel ==
- Mike Patton – vocals, keyboards and samples
- Duane Denison – guitar
- Kevin Rutmanis – bass
- John Stanier – drums

Production

- Joe Funderburk – engineering, mixing
- JD Wilkes – harmonica on "Point and Click"
- Lynd Ward – cover artwork

== Chart performance ==
Tomahawk reached its highest chart position on the United States Independent Albums chart, reaching a peak position of 20 and spending two weeks in that chart. It also reached a peak of 31 in that country's Top Heatseekers chart. It spent one week in the Australian ARIA Charts, reaching number 37.

Chart performance for Tomahawk
Country	Chart	Peak position	Ref.
Australia	ARIA Charts	37	
United States	Independent Albums	20	
United States	Top Heatseekers	31	
