= Tomahawk (band) =

American rock supergroup

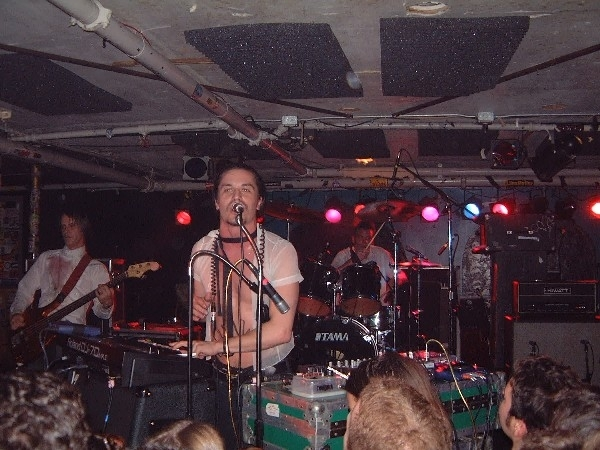
- Tomahawk in 2002 at The Middle East

Background information
- Origin: Nashville, Tennessee, U.S.
- Genres: Alternative metal; alternative rock; avant-garde metal; experimental rock
- Years active: 1999–2004, 2006–2008, 2011–2014, 2020–present
- Label: Ipecac
- Members: Mike Patton; Duane Denison; John Stanier; Trevor Dunn
- Past members: Kevin Rutmanis
- Website: ipecac.com/artists/tomahawk

Tomahawk is an American rock supergroup from Nashville, Tennessee. They formed in 1999 when singer/keyboardist Mike Patton (Faith No More, Mr. Bungle) met guitar player Duane Denison (The Jesus Lizard) and the pair started swapping tapes with the intention of collaborating. Denison then recruited drummer John Stanier (Helmet), while Patton invited bass player Kevin Rutmanis (Melvins/ex-Cows). The group recorded three albums and toured extensively from 2000–2007 then went on extended hiatus, and reformed in 2013 with Trevor Dunn replacing Rutmanis.

== History ==
=== Early days (1999–2000) ===
When Faith No More broke up in 1998 Mike Patton created the record label Ipecac Recordings, returned to work with his other band Mr. Bungle, and formed the metal supergroup Fantômas with Buzz Osborne of the Melvins and Dave Lombardo of Slayer. Patton met Duane Denison in 1999 at a Mr. Bungle concert in Nashville and the two began exchanging music and jamming.

=== Tomahawk (2001–2002) ===
During May and June 2001, the band recorded their debut album in Nashville. The album was released on October 30, 2001, it was produced by Joe Funderburk. After the release of Tomahawk, the band began touring extensively, playing in many countries around the world, including the United States, Australia, Europe and Japan. They generally headlined shows but were the supporting act for bands such as Tool. When opening for Tool on their 2002 summer tour of North America, the band was frequently booed for insulting the crowds. Tomahawk also played at various festivals, including the 2002 Big Day Out festival in Australia.

=== Mit Gas (2003–2004) ===
Their second album, Mit Gas, recorded with producer Joe Barresi, was released in 2003. Tomahawk took part in the "Geek Tour" during 2003, which featured labelmates the Melvins and Fantômas. During the band's early years they were known for dressing up as police officers in promotional photo shoots and during concerts. The band went on a short hiatus from 2004 to 2006 after finishing touring for Tomahawk and Mit Gas in late 2003 as the members began to focus on other projects.

=== Anonymous (2007–2008) ===
The band's third album, Anonymous, was released on June 19, 2007 through Ipecac Recordings. Kevin Rutmanis left the band during the recording for unknown reasons. For the album, Denison and Stanier recorded their parts in Nashville, and then sent their finished product to San Francisco where Patton added his vocals and samples. No live shows were performed during this period. Tomahawk remained inactive from 2008 to 2011.

=== Oddfellows (2012–2014) ===
In July 2011, Mike Patton announced that Tomahawk was preparing to record its fourth album. In early 2012, Tomahawk announced that Trevor Dunn (Mr. Bungle, Fantômas, John Zorn, MadLove, Trevor Dunn's Trio-Convulsant) would play bass for the band. On April 21, 2012 the band released Eponymous To Anonymous, a box set containing the band's first three records released on vinyl for the first time. In late 2012, the band began playing their first live shows since 2003. On December 3, 2012, a full-length video for first single, "Stone Letter", was posted online. Oddfellows was released January 29, 2013. The band were scheduled to play in Mexico for the first time on March 21, 2014 but withdrew due to an illness. On April 9, 2014 the band announced they would be releasing two previously unreleased tracks from the Oddfellows recording session. The single, entitled M.E.A.T., was first released on May 23, 2014 on vinyl.

=== Tonic Immobility (2020–present) ===
In February 2020, Duane Denison revealed that Tomahawk had been writing and recording new record material. On January 21, 2021, a single called "Business Casual" was released, which also revealed the name of their upcoming fifth album as Tonic Immobility, which has later been released on March 26, 2021. Bassist Trevor Dunn remarked in 2021, "Me and Duane [Denison] and John [Stanier] recorded all of our parts for that record about four years ago actually. Duane had finished the music and I guess Mike was busy at the time, so John and I flew down to Nashville and recorded with Duane. Then over the years, we've just been waiting for Mike, and he's been doing other stuff so it took a while. I think the pandemic kind of helped spur it along because he was stuck at home, so he wrote the vocal melodies and the rest of the lyrics at his studio in San Francisco.".

On October 15, 2024, Tomahawk announced that they would be performing at the 2025 Sick New World Festival in Las Vegas, marking their first show since 2013, however, one month after the announcement, the entire festival was canceled due to logistical issues.

The band is scheduled to tour with Melvins for one month in 2026 in celebration of its 25th anniversary. Despite the renewed activity, the band has clarified that there is currently no new music being worked on.

== Members ==
=== Current members ===
- Mike Patton – vocals, keyboards (1999–2004, 2006–2008, 2011–2014, 2020–present)
- Duane Denison – guitars (1999–2004, 2006–2008, 2011–2014, 2020–present)
- John Stanier – drums (1999–2004, 2006–2008, 2011–2014, 2020–present)
- Trevor Dunn – bass (2011–2014, 2020–present)

=== Former members ===
- Kevin Rutmanis – bass (1999–2004, 2006–2007)

== Musical style and influences ==
Several critics have described Tomahawk's style as alternative metal, alternative rock, avant-garde metal, and experimental rock. Their sound has also been labeled as art rock, avant-prog, noise rock, post-rock, progressive metal, and progressive rock. In 2002, the band considered their genre to be "cinematic rock", since all members were fans of film soundtracks. Butch Lazorchak of the Boston Herald has compared the band's sound to 1970s hard rock groups such as Blue Öyster Cult.

The band's self-titled first album combines rock with elements of experimental music, country music, and hardcore; critic Blake Butler of Allmusic described their debut album as one of the most straightforward rock-oriented projects of Patton following his work with Faith No More, but he still notes their eclectic side stating that they are not a “mass-marketable band.” Their second album Mit Gas features influences from metal as well as punk rock. The album also includes instrumental segues. The band's 2007 album Anonymous incorporates Native American music elements. Oddfellows features a more accessible sound which the band has labeled as "avant-pop". The record includes influences from jazz music.

== Discography ==
=== Studio albums ===
Year	Album details	Peak chart positions						
Year	Album details	US	US Heat.	US Ind.	AUS	BEL (FL)	NOR	UK
2001	Tomahawk: Released: October 30, 2001; Label: Ipecac; Formats: CD, DI	—	31	20	37	—	—	—
2003	Mit Gas: Released: May 6, 2003; Label: Ipecac; Formats: CD, DI	137	3	7	28	—	17	98
2007	Anonymous: Released: June 19, 2007; Label: Ipecac; Formats: CD, DI	158	2	12	32	—	31	—
2013	Oddfellows: Released: January 29, 2013; Label: Ipecac; Formats: CD, DI, LP	69	—	9	37	149	—	—
2021	Tonic Immobility: Released: March 26, 2021; Label: Ipecac; Formats: CD, DI, LP	—	—	—	18	182	—	—

=== Box sets ===
Year	Album details
2012	Eponymous to Anonymous: Released: April 21, 2012; Label: Ipecac; Formats: LP

=== Singles ===
Title	Year	Album
"Rape This Day"	2003	Mit Gas
"Sun Dance"	2007	Anonymous
"Stone Letter"	2012	Oddfellows
"M.E.A.T."	2014	Non-album single
"Business Casual"	2021	Tonic Immobility
"Dog Eat Dog"	2021	Tonic Immobility
"Predators and Scavengers"	2021	Tonic Immobility

=== Music videos ===
The band's first music video was for "Rape This Day" from Mit Gas, featuring a cameo from Queens of the Stone Age's Nick Oliveri. No official music videos were released for Anonymous. For the release of Oddfellows in 2013 the band made music videos for "Stone Letter" and the title-track. In August 2014, over a year after the release of Oddfellows, the band released a music video for "South Paw". In addition to the band's six official music videos, there have also been a number of unofficial/fan-made videos.

Year	Song
2003	"Rape This Day"
2012	"Stone Letter"
2013	"Oddfellows"
2014	"South Paw"
2021	"Dog Eat Dog"
2021	"Predators and Scavengers"
