= Duane Denison =

American musician (born 1959)

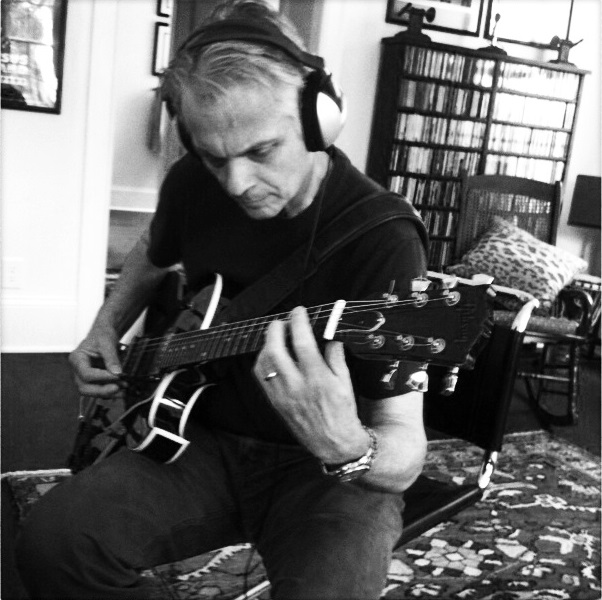
- Denison in 2017

Background information
- Genres: Alternative rock; experimental rock; noise rock; punk blues; post-punk; alternative metal; jazz; rockabilly; outlaw country
- Occupations: Musician; composer
- Instrument: Guitar
- Years active: 1987–present
- Labels: Touch and Go; Capitol; Ipecac Recordings; Riot House Records

Duane Denison (born January 21, 1959) is an American musician best known for his work as a guitarist, composer, and founding member of alternative rock bands The Jesus Lizard and Tomahawk.

== Biography ==
At an early age, Denison began piano lessons and was performing with local bands by age 15. After high school, he earned a degree in classical guitar from Eastern Michigan University.

While living in Austin, Texas in 1986, Denison made his first recordings in the band Cargo Cult. Their debut album was released by Touch and Go Records and led to meeting the other members of what would eventually become The Jesus Lizard. Rolling Stone included two of the Jesus Lizard's albums, Goat and Liar, on its "Top 100 Albums of the '90s" list.

Beginning in the 1990s, Denison also worked on numerous recording sessions, playing on albums by Bobby Bare Jr., Andrew Bird, Buñuel, Firewater, Beverley Knight, Laura J. Martin, Pigface, Revolting Cocks, Silver Jews, Sally Timms and Jack White, among others. He has worked with producers as varied as Steve Albini, Paul Allen, Joe Barresi, John Cale, Andy Gill, Mark Nevers, Garth Richardson, Dave Sardy, and many more.

After the Jesus Lizard broke up in 1999, Denison moved to Nashville and began playing with Hank Williams III's "Damn Band". Shortly after relocating, Denison began collaborating and exchanging demo tapes with Mike Patton, whom he met at a Mr. Bungle show in 1999. They formed Tomahawk and released their self-titled first album, Tomahawk, in 2001, followed by Mit Gas in 2003 and Anonymous in 2007.

In 2007, Denison and ex-Ministry bassist Paul Barker formed U.S.S.A. and released one album, The Spoils. From 2008 until 2012, Denison toured with the Legendary Shack Shakers and played guitar on their album AgriDustrial (2010).

In 2012, Spin included Denison in its list of the "100 Greatest Guitarists of All Time", stating: "Denison has played warped jazz-rock with Firewater, cool jazz with the Denison-Kimball Trio, experimental alt-metal with Tomahawk, rockabilly punk with Th' Legendary Shack Shakers, and outlaw country with Hank Williams III. But the angular, metallic sheets of noise that Denison unleashed with the Jesus Lizard are what he'll ultimately be remembered and revered for. Tightly controlled yet capable of ripping and tearing like a runaway chainsaw, Denison's riffs influenced an entire generation of post-hardcore guitarists, including the burgeoning wave of noise-punkers like the Men and Roomrunner."

In 2013, Sam Fogarino of Interpol recruited Denison to play guitar on the EmptyMansions album snakes/vultures/sulfate. Tomahawk also released the album Oddfellows the same year. In 2014, Denison released a self-titled album with The Unsemble, featuring Alexander Hacke of Einstürzende Neubauten, on Ipecac Recordings.

In the following years, subsequent tours and albums followed, including Tomahawk's album Tonic Immobility in 2021, the Jesus Lizard's album Rack in 2024, and the Jesus Lizard's EP Flux in 2025. In April 2025, Denison performed in the house band for a Bobby Bare 90th birthday tribute show in Nashville, which also featured Steve Earle, Emmylou Harris, Buddy Miller and Lucinda Williams, among others.

In 2026, Denison toured North America with Tomahawk on the "A Huge Waste of Your Time and Money" tour. He also formed a new group, D2 Archipelago, with Nashville musicians Brian Kotzur and Matt Swanson.

== Influence ==
Duane Denison's playing has influenced several notable guitarists, including Limp Bizkit's Wes Borland, Jimmy Eat World's Jim Adkins, and Every Time I Die's Andy Williams.
