= Legendary Shack Shakers =

American rock band

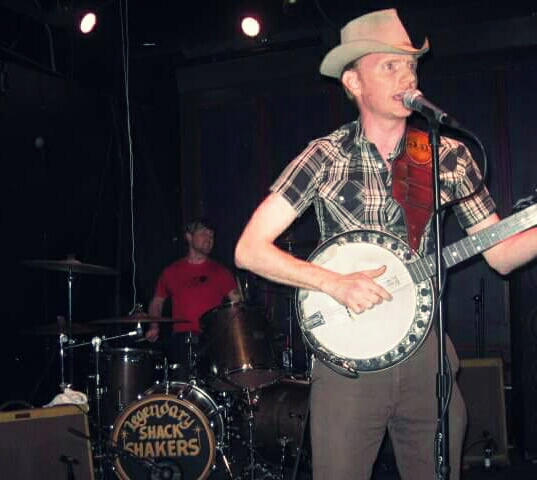
- Legendary Shack Shakers in Lexington, Kentucky 2010

Background information
- Origin: Murray, Kentucky, United States
- Genres: Rockabilly; blues; country; blues rock; southern rock; roots rock; punk rock; gothic country
- Years active: 1995–present
- Labels: Alternative Tentacles; Yep Roc; Bloodshot
- Members: J.D. Wilkes; David Lee; Gary Siperko; Fuller Condon; Preston Corn
- Past members: Mark Robertson; Rod Hamdallah; Brett Whitacre; Chris Dettloff; Paul Simmons; JoeBuck; Jerry Roe; Duane Denison

The Legendary Shack Shakers (originally Those or Th' ) are an American rock band from Murray, Kentucky that was formed in 1995 by J.D. Wilkes. The original line-up formed the band out of a shared interest in rockabilly, blues and Western swing. Subsequently, the band gained prominence in the alternative country scene with a sound that encompassed rockabilly, blues, country and punk rock and a lyrical focus on Southern Gothic themes. Over time, the band's sound shifted to emphasize country music.

== History ==
=== Formation ===
Singer and harmonica player J.D. Wilkes developed an interest in Delta blues music as a teenager living in Paducah, Kentucky as a result of disinterest in the decade's popular music styles, familiarizing himself with the music of Muddy Waters, Lightning Hopkins, Brownie McGhee and Charlie Patton before moving backward into older styles of music "to see the roots of the roots". He formed the Legendary Shack Shakers in Paducah with members of another band, Solid Rocket Boosters, who shared his interest in rockabilly, blues and Western swing; according to Wilkes, the only difference between the two bands was that they have different drummers. The original lineup of the Legendary Shack Shakers consisted of Wilkes, guitarists Nathan Brown and Brian Berryman, upright bassist Todd Anderson and drummer Chris Dettloff—three of which were Murray State art majors, while the remaining two were a physics major and a psychology major. The band's line-up subsequently changed to Wilkes on lead vocals and harmonica, JoeBuck on guitar, Mark "The Duke" Robertson on upright bass, and Pauly Simmonz on drums, all of which alternatively played for local country music acts, most notably with Wilkes and JoeBuck touring as members of Hank Williams III's backing band.

=== Breakthroughs ===
Legendary Shack Shakers' 2002 album, Cockadoodledon't, established their prominence in the alternative country scene. After self-releasing their recordings, including Cockadoodledon't, the self-classified "insurgent country" record label Bloodshot Records reissued Cockadoodledon't in 2003. After JoeBuck left the band to join Hank Williams III's band full time, David Lee became the Legendary Shack Shakers' new guitarist, and the band signed with Yep Roc Records.

In 2005, Simmonz left the band and was replaced by Brett Whitacre. that year, Robert Plant asked the Legendary Shack Shakers to open for him on his European tour. The following year, the band opened for Marty Stewart and Travis Tritt in 2006 at the Ryman Auditorium in Nashville, Tennessee. Subsequently, the band experienced increased mainstream media attention when GEICO featured their song "CB Song" in one of their commercials, and the band's song "Swampblood" was included on the soundtrack to the HBO series True Blood, earning the band a Grammy Award nomination. 2009 saw the addition of Duane Denison, formerly of the Jesus Lizard, to the line-up. The band released their seventh studio album; AgriDustrial, on April 13, 2010, on their own Colonel Knowledge record label. The band would subsequently go on hiatus from 2010 to 2015, after which they reformed with a new line-up consisting of Wilkes on vocals, harmonica and banjo, Robertson on bass, Rod Hamdallah on guitar, and Brett Whitacre on drums, and signed with Alternative Tentacles.

In 2017, Wilkes released his first solo album, Fire Dream, and the Legendary Shack Shakers' line-up changed to Wilkes, Hamdallah and new rhythm section, bassist Fuller Condon and drummer Preston Corn, before the band recorded and released the album After You've Gone, a song cycle inspired by Wilkes' divorce. In 2019, the band performed on the PBS television series Sun Studio Sessions, and released an album of this performance under the title Live from Sun Studio. In 2020, the band planned to play in Aurora, Kentucky, but the performance was cancelled due to the COVID-19 pandemic and subsequently delayed until the following year. With a new line-up consisting of Wilkes, guitarist Gary Siperko, upright bassist Fuller Condon and drummer Preston Corn, the band released Cockadoodledeux, an album of traditional country and Western songs which includes guest appearances by seven former members of the band, as well as Alternative Tentacles founder Jello Biafra.

== Musical style ==
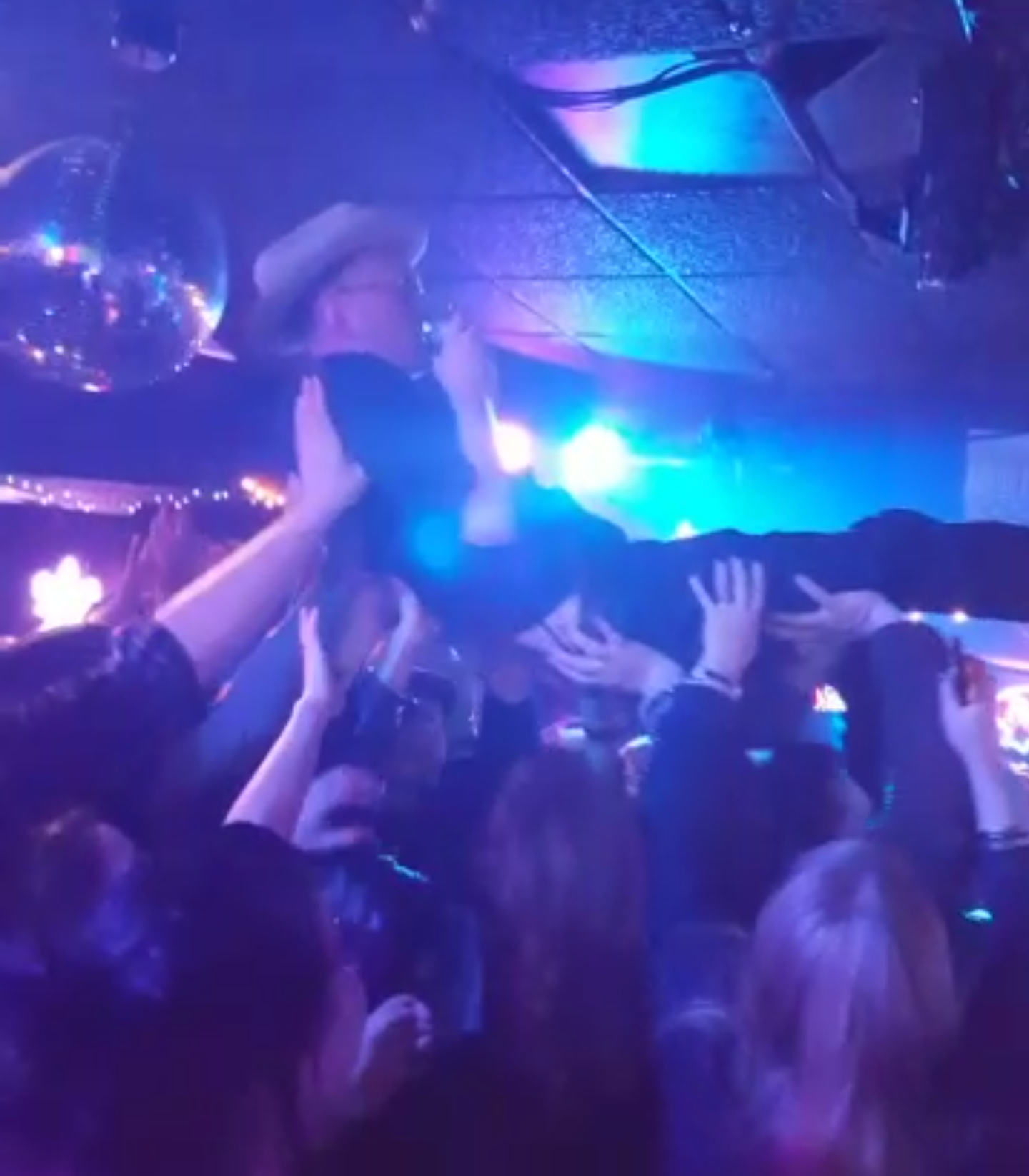
J.D. Wilkes of Legendary Shack Shakers crowd surfs while performing in Atlanta, Georgia in 2016.

Bass Frontiers wrote that Legendary Shack Shakers "have been billed as everything from rockabilly to gothic country, psychobilly and alt. country". J.D. Wilkes says that the original incarnation of the Legendary Shack Shakers focused on playing rockabilly, "hillbilly" music, Memphis blues and Western swing. Wilkes described the Legendary Shack Shakers' music as "Americana rockabilly"; Vail Daily said that the band performs a mix of blues, rock, punk rock, and country music. The Phoenix New Times said that "the southern gothic rockabilly act goes above and beyond much of those genres to throw down their captivating version of hillbilly blues-rock." The Kalamazoo Gazette described the Legendary Shack Shakers' music as "mutant Southern rock". AllMusic described the Legendary Shack Shakers as a "raucous roots rock band". According to City Beast, the band's musical style also encompasses country blues and carnival music.

Wilkes publicly disavowed the psychobilly label the band is sometimes categorized under, considering the genre's performers "all pompadour and no substance", stating of the scene, "These new bands trying to sound like the Cramps or doing the ‘hellbilly’ thing — they only pick up on the clichés of it." Wilkes took issue with the genre's fans' lack of familiarity with rockabilly artists like Charlie Feathers and dismissed psychobilly performers as "mall punk with pompadours", calling psychobilly fans "pompadork". Additionally, Wilkes "openly expressed disdain for alt-country and its musical carpetbaggers", according to The A.V. Club.

Wilkes stated regarding the band's use of the term "Southern Gothic", "I don’t think we’re Goth in the sense of veils and black clothing, people in perpetual mourning, funereal mode. [...] It’s the traditional term, rather than the trendy, Americanized, fad version of it. [...] [Southern Gothic] takes an angle that there’s something grotesque and beautiful in the traditions of the South, the backdrop of Southern living." Wilkes connects the many styles the band performs to the blues, saying that he considers rockabilly "the white man's version of blues" and klezmer to be "the Jew's blues". He described the band's performance as being "like a Pentecostal church revival, whipping them into a frenzy and getting them involved in the moment."

When Duane Denison joined the band, the Legendary Shack Shakers shifted their sound again, with Wilkes calling this new sound "agridustrial", explaining that it is "kind of chunky industrial patterns, but give it kind of a rustic feel [...] like the sounds of farm implements, that clanking cacophony of rural industry. Kind of like how Johnny Cash used a train rhythm." Since 2015, the Legendary Shack Shakers have predominantly played country music.

Wilkes cited as musical influences Little Walter, Howlin' Wolf, Tom Waits, the Louvin Brothers, Dock Boggs, James Harman and Roscoe Holcomb. Outside of musical influences, Gary Larson's The Far Side cartoon "Cow Tools" inspired the name of one of the band's introductions.

== Discography ==
Studio albums

- J.D.'s Tasteless Chill Tonic (Conan Records, 1996)
- Hunkerdown (Spinout, 1998)
- Cockadoodledon't (Bloodshot, 2003)
- Believe (YepRoc, 2004)
- Pandelirium (YepRoc, 2006)
- Swampblood (YepRoc, 2007)
- AgriDustrial (Colonel Knowledge, 2010)
- The Southern Surreal (Alternative Tentacles Records, 2015)
- After You've Gone (Last Chance Records, 2017)
- Cockadoodledeux (Alternative Tentacles, 2021)

Live albums

- Lower Broad Lo-Fi (Arkam Records, 2007)
- Live from Sun Studio (Chicken Ranch Records, 2020)

== Filmography ==
- Seven Signs, shown at the Raindance Film Festival 2008
