= Oddfellows (album) =

Studio album by Tomahawk
- Released: January 29, 2013
- Recorded: 2012
- Studio: Easy Eye (Nashville, Tennessee)
- Genre: Experimental rock, alternative rock
- Length: 40:42
- Label: Ipecac Recordings
- Producer: Tomahawk, Collin Dupuis

Tomahawk chronology
| Anonymous (2007) | Oddfellows (2013) | Tonic Immobility (2021) |

Singles from Oddfellows
- 1. "Stone Letter" Released: November 23, 2012

Oddfellows is the fourth studio album by musical supergroup Tomahawk. The album is the first to feature new bass player Trevor Dunn, who has replaced previous member Kevin Rutmanis. Oddfellows was recorded live in the Easy Eye Sound Studio in Nashville, Tennessee, after a brief period of rehearsal. Guitarist Duane Denison favored the location as its cheaper studio costs allowed for longer periods of song-writing.

The album was released on January 29, 2013, through the record label Ipecac Recordings. The release of Oddfellows was preceded by a single, "Stone Letter", first released on November 23, 2012, as part of Record Store Day's "Black Friday" event. Reviews for Oddfellows have been positive, and Dunn's presence has been seen by critics as a positive addition. The album reached chart positions in several countries, including the United Kingdom, Australia, Belgium and the United States.

== Production ==
Following the departure of previous bass player Kevin Rutmanis, Oddfellows features new band member Trevor Dunn on bass. Dunn had previously worked with singer Mike Patton in the bands Mr. Bungle and Fantômas. The album was recorded over six days in Easy Eye Sound Studios in Nashville, Tennessee, and produced by Collin Dupuis and the band. Dupuis had previously worked with the band The Black Keys, whose singer Dan Auerbach owns Easy Eye Sound. Cartoonist Ivan Brunetti has provided the album's cover artwork.

Drummer John Stanier has described the band as "the absolute simplest, most professional ensemble I have ever been involved with, by far". The band planned to meet and rehearse for a week before recording the album, but upon getting together again, Patton experienced a death in the family which resulted in him leaving for several days. The band eventually reconvened to rehearse for what Stanier recalls as "a day and a half". Denison felt positively about the process of recording in Nashville, finding that the cheaper studio costs meant he could allow his compositions to "gestate" for longer during his writing process.

Fifteen tracks were recorded for the album, thirteen of which were included on its release. Spin magazine's Christopher R. Weingarten has described the record as featuring a mix of genres, including "groany, smoky, Morricone-jazz" and "the types of epic, majestic choruses that Patton diehards might remember from the final Faith No More LP, Album of the Year". Denison has described the album's sound as just being that of "a rock band", adding "I think we’re a very clever, intense sort of spooked-out, dangerous rock band, but still a rock band".

== Release ==
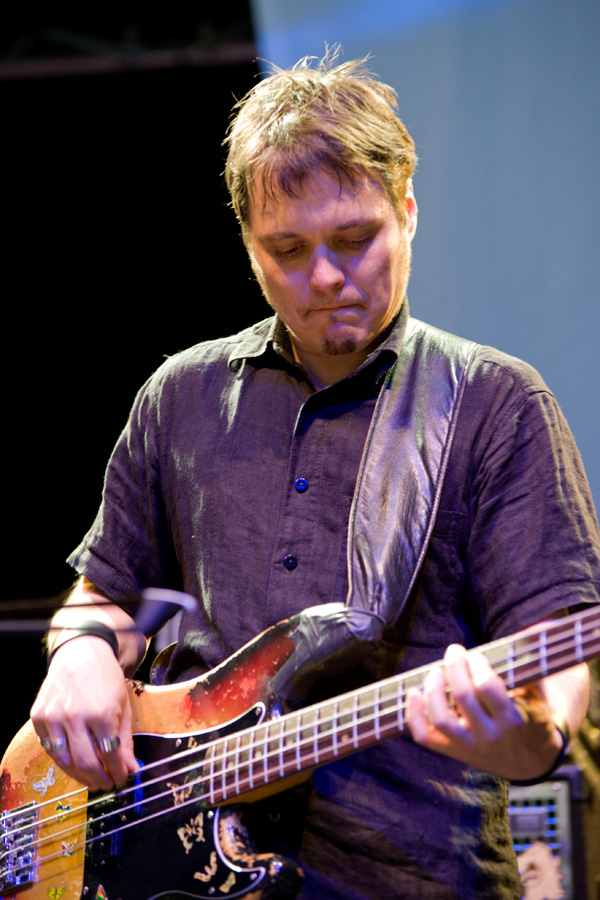
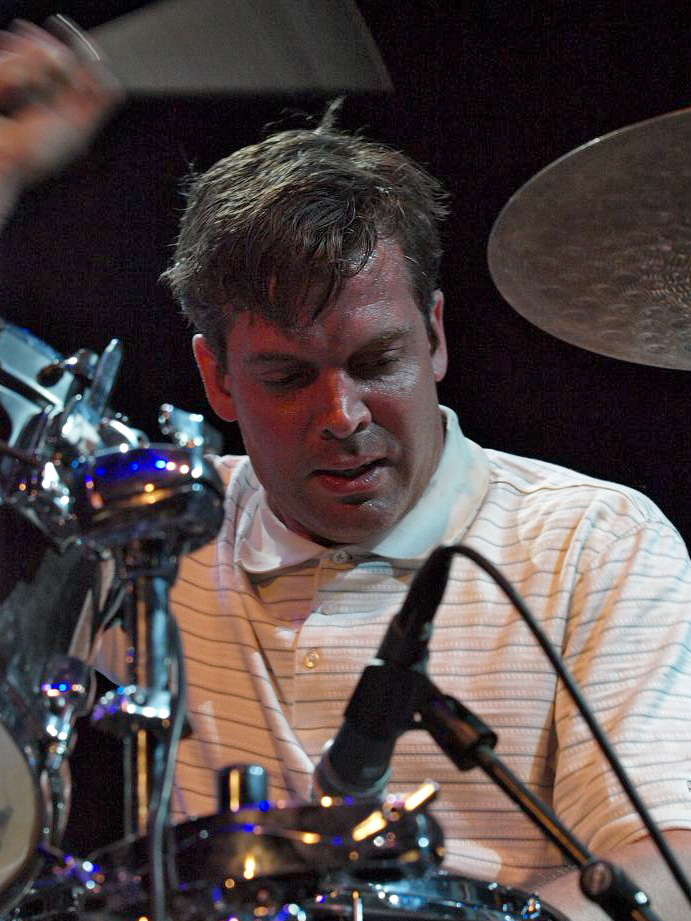
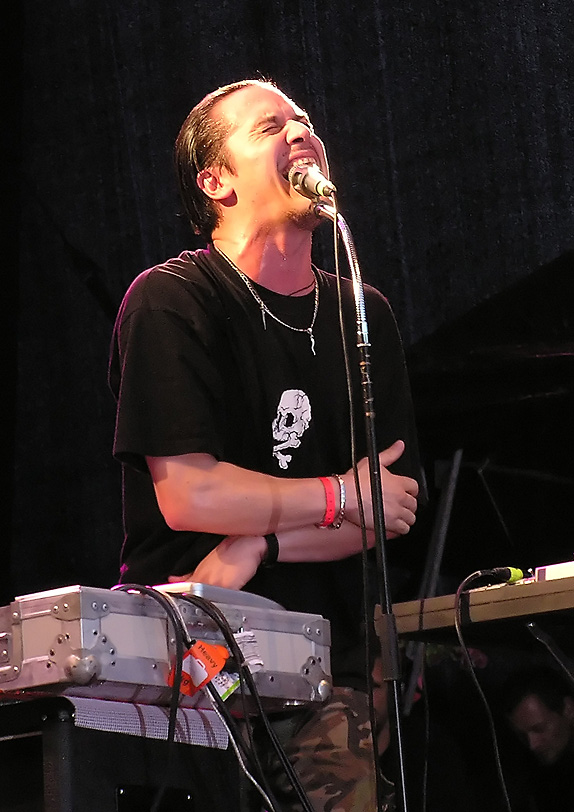
Trevor Dunn in 2012 (left), John Stanier in 2008 (center) and Mike Patton in 2005 (right)

Oddfellows was released on January 29, 2013, through Ipecac Recordings, the label owned by Patton. The album had been completed for several months by this point, but its release date was moved back as the band's members did not have time to promote an earlier release. To support the album's release, the band played at the Voodoo Experience music festival in New Orleans, Louisiana in October 2012; and the Austin, Texas Fun Fun Fun Fest, along with several tour dates in the United States in October and November.

The band initially announced the release of "Waratorium" as a seven-inch record as part of Record Store Day's "Black Friday" event on November 23, 2012; eventually releasing "Stone Letter" instead. The single featured illustrations by Brunetti, and was released as a digital download on December 4, 2012. Its accompanying music video was directed by Vincent Forcier, using concert footage from Tomahawk's 2012 concerts. Another music video was also made for the title track.

Oddfellows debuted at number sixteen on the UK Rock Chart album countdown on February 9, 2013, spending one week in the chart. In the United States, Oddfellows recorded positions in several of Billboard magazine's charts—reaching a peak position of 69 on the Billboard 200, 12 on the Alternative Albums listings, second place on the Hard Rock Albums chart, and ninth on the Independent Albums chart. Oddfellows also reached chart positions in Australia, Belgium and Finland. The album reached number 37 on the ARIA Charts, 137 in the Ultratop countdown, and 26 in The Official Finnish Charts.

== Reception ==
Professional ratings
Aggregate scores
| Source | Rating |
|---|---|
| Metacritic | 79/100 |
Review scores
| Source | Rating |
| AllRovi | 4/5 stars |
| The A.V. Club | A− |
| Consequence of Sound | 3/5 stars |
| Decibel Magazine | 7/10 stars |
| Drowned in Sound | 8/10 stars |
| Pitchfork Media | 6.8/10 |
| PopMatters | 8/10 stars |
| Revolver | 4/5 stars |
| Spin | 7/10 stars |

Oddfellows has received mostly positive reviews since its release. Review aggregation website Metacritic lists the album as having an average rating of 79 out of 100, based on twenty reviews.

Writing for AllRovi, Jason Lymangrover rated the album four stars out of five. Lymangrover praised both Dunn's bass playing and Patton's vocals, and felt that the album was "a welcome return to form", similar in sound to their 2001 debut album. Jason Heller of The A.V. Club awarded the album an "A−". Heller felt that Oddfellows featured "tighter songs and sturdier structures" than the band's previous work, which he considered comparable to that of a jam band. Drowned in Sound's Kev Eddy scored Oddfellows eight out of ten, comparing it favorably to the work of Patton's earlier band Faith No More. Eddy felt that the album was less experimental than previous Tomahawk records, but that its restraint was positive and accessible. Paige Camisasca of Revolver magazine scored the album four out of five, calling it a "surprising, thoroughly consistent return-to-form". Camiscasca considered "Stone Letter", "Waratorium" and "I.O.U." to be the album's highlights, and earmarked it as "the first contender for hard-rock album of the year".

Spin magazine's Grayson Currin rated Oddfellows seven out of ten, finding that it "presents a tide of ideas, information, and intrigue". Currin felt that the album attempted to blend both art rock and mainstream rock sounds, but was more successful when aiming solely for experimentation—finding "I Can Almost See Them" and "A Thousand Eyes" to be examples of this. Consequence of Sound writer Len Comaratta awarded Oddfellows three stars out of five, finding that Dunn's bass playing improves the band's sound without altering it radically. Comaratta felt that the album rewarded patient listeners but did not provide memorable hooks or melodies, and compared its "laid back" sound to that of Nick Cave and the Bad Seeds.

Cole Waterman of PopMatters awarded the album a score of eight out of ten, finding the record to be the group's "most accessible by far". Waterman described the album's composition as "catchy", finding it to be an appropriate response to the band's previous album Anonymous; he also highlighted the "absurdist" tone of the record's lyrics—pointing out "South Paw" and "Waratorium" as particular examples of this. Pitchfork Media's Paul Thompson scored Oddfellows 6.8 out of ten, considering it "Tomahawk's most straightforward, stripped-down release to date". Thompson considered the group's main dynamic to consist of Denison's compositions and Patton's vocals, finding that bass player Dunn "hangs back here, ably holding down the low end without overasserting himself". Thompson also debated the effect that the album's short germination period had on its overall composition, believing that the brief recording time lent the record "a feeling that, whenever you get these guys in the same room, this music [...] just comes tearing out".

== Track listing ==
All tracks written by Mike Patton and Duane Denison.

| No. | Title | Length |
|---|---|---|
| 1. | "Oddfellows" | 3:29 |
| 2. | "Stone Letter" | 2:52 |
| 3. | "I.O.U." | 2:38 |
| 4. | "White Hats / Black Hats" | 3:21 |
| 5. | "A Thousand Eyes" | 2:40 |
| 6. | "Rise Up Dirty Waters" | 3:06 |
| 7. | "The Quiet Few" | 3:48 |
| 8. | ""I Can Almost See Them"" | 2:36 |
| 9. | "South Paw" | 4:00 |
| 10. | "Choke Neck" | 3:51 |
| 11. | "Waratorium" | 3:27 |
| 12. | "Baby Let's Play ____" | 2:43 |
| 13. | "Typhoon" | 2:11 |
| Total length: | | 40:42 |

== Personnel ==
- Mike Patton – vocals, keyboards
- Trevor Dunn – bass guitar
- Duane Denison – guitars
- John Stanier – drums

== Chart performance ==
| Country | Chart | Peak position | Weeks | Ref |
|---|---|---|---|---|
| Australia | ARIA Charts | 37 | 1 | |
| Belgium | Ultratop | 137 | 3 | |
| Finland | The Official Finnish Charts | 26 | 1 | |
| United Kingdom | UK Rock Chart | 16 | 1 | |
| United States | Billboard 200 | 69 | 1 | |
| United States | Alternative Albums | 12 | 1 | |
| United States | Hard Rock Albums | 2 | 2 | |
| United States | Independent Albums | 9 | 2 | |
