= Ipecac Recordings discography =

Ipecac Recordings
- Founded: April 1999
- Founder: Mike Patton; Greg Werckman
- Distributor(s): Southern Records
- Genre: Rock, heavy metal, experimental, alternative hip hop
- Country of origin: United States
- Location: Orinda, California
- Official website: ipecac.com

Ipecac Recordings is an American independent record label founded in 1999 by Greg Werckman and Mike Patton. The label was established to release Patton's band Fantômas' self-titled début, allowing retention of "all the creative control". Its creation also provided the Melvins – friends of Werckman and Patton's – with a label.

Ipecac has distributed material by other artists, including Isis, Dälek, and many of Patton's other projects and collaborations. Though the label's main output is rock and experimental music, it has also released DVDs, a book, soundtracks and a work of comedy. Alongside original content, it has been responsible for re-releasing older and imported recordings originally handled by other labels, as well as vinyl releases of later albums by Queens of the Stone Age.

== Key ==
No.	The release's unique catalog number. These are formatted as IPC-000.
CD	Compact disc
7"	7 inch single
LP	Long play
DVD	Digital versatile disc

== List of releases ==
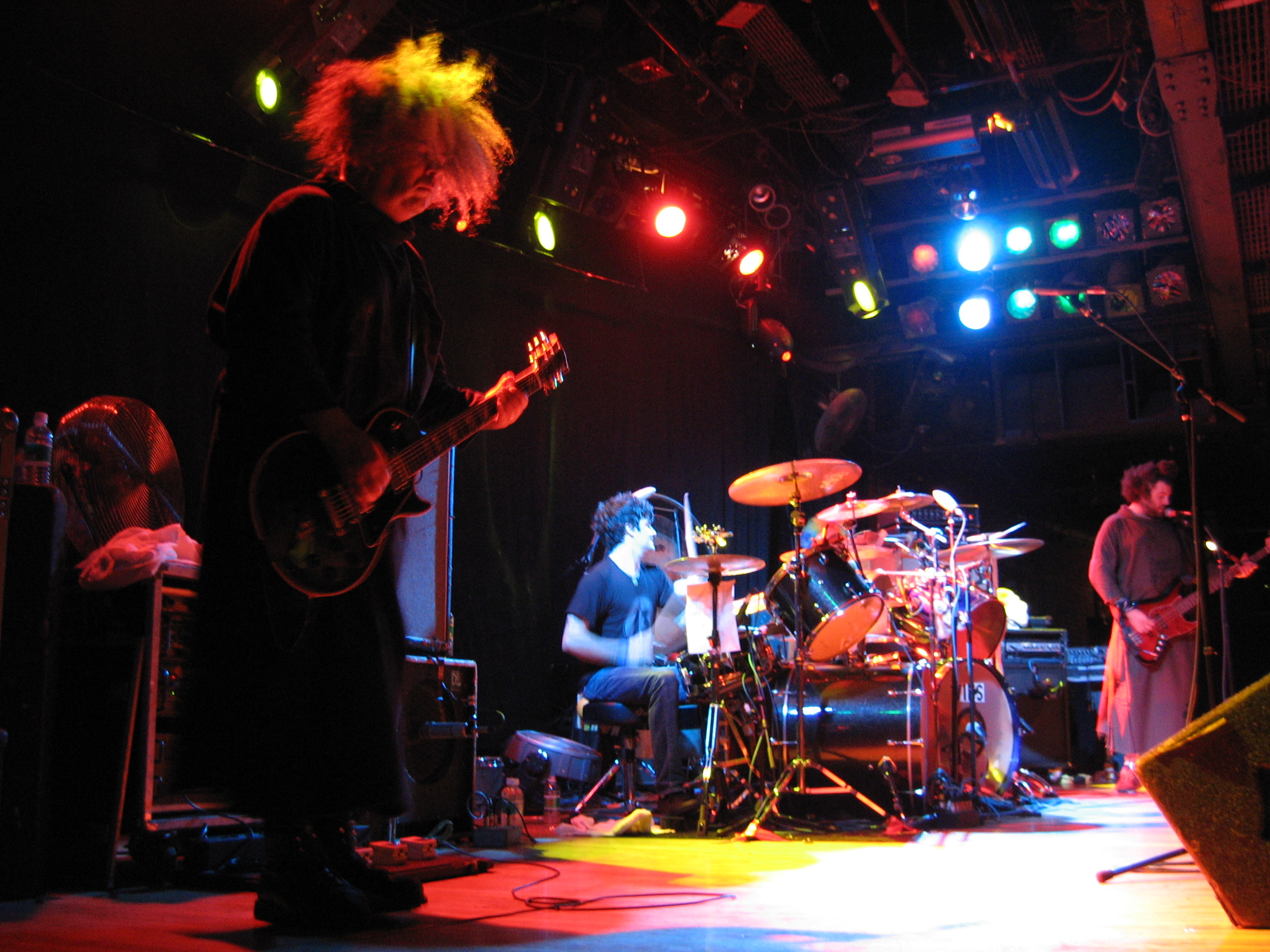
Melvins, who have released several records on Ipecac

No.	Artist	Title	Format	Year
001	Fantômas	Fantômas	CD	1999
002	Melvins	The Maggot	CD	1999
003	Maldoror	She	CD	1999
004	Melvins	The Bootlicker	CD	1999
005	The Kids of Widney High	Let's Get Busy	CD	1999
006	Melvins	The Crybaby	CD	2000
007	Kid606	Down With the Scene	CD	2000
008	The Lucky Stars	Hollywood & Western	CD	2000
009	Ministry	Live – Psalm 69 Tour 1992 [cancelled]	—	—
010	Neil Hamburger	Great Phone Calls featuring Neil Hamburger [reissue]	CD	2000
011	Melvins	The Trilogy Vinyl	LP	2000
012	Melvins	Gluey Porch Treatments [reissue]	CD	2000
013	DJ Eddie Def	Inner Scratch Demons	CD	2001
014	Melvins	Colossus of Destiny	CD	2001
015	eX-Girl	Back to the Mono Kero	CD	2001
016	Sensational	Get on My Page	CD	2001
017	Fantômas	The Director's Cut	CD	2001
018	Tomahawk	Tomahawk	CD	2001
019	The Fantômas Melvins Big Band	Millennium Monsterwork 2000	CD	2002
020	Melvins	Hostile Ambient Takeover	CD	2002
021	Melvins	"Black Stooges"	7"	2003
022	Melvins	"Dr. Geek"	7"	2003
023	Melvins	"Judas Chang"	7"	2003
024	Melvins	"Fool"	7"	2003
025	Melvins	"Brain Center"	7"	2003
026	Melvins	"Foaming"	7"	2003
027	Melvins	"Antivermin"	7"	2003
028	Steroid Maximus	Ectopia	CD	2002
029	Skeleton Key	Obtainium	CD	2002
030	Dälek	From Filthy Tongue of Gods and Griots	CD	2002
031	Phantomsmasher	Phantomsmasher	CD	2002
032	Isis	Oceanic	CD	2002
033	Moistboyz	III	CD	2002
034	Yoshimi & Yuka	Flower with No Color	CD	2003
035	Ruins	Tzomborgha	CD	2002
036	The Young Gods	Second Nature [reissue]	CD	2003
037	Kaada	Thank You for Giving Me Your Valuable Time [reissue]	CD	2003
038	Melvins	26 Songs	CD	2003
039	Pink Anvil	Halloween Party	CD	2003
040	Tomahawk	Mit Gas	CD	2003
041	Mondo Generator	A Drug Problem That Never Existed	CD	2003
042	Curse of the Golden Vampire	Mass Destruction	CD	2003
043	Queens of the Stone Age	Songs for the Deaf	LP	2003
044	Desert Sessions	Volumes 9 & 10	CD	2003
045	Fantômas	Delìrium Còrdia	CD	2003
046	kid606	Kill Sound Before Sound Kills You	CD	2003
047	Melvins	Neither Here nor There	CD/book	2004
048	Bohren & der Club of Gore	Black Earth	CD	2003
049	End	The Sounds of Disaster	CD	2004
050	Eyvind Kang	Virginal Co Ordinates	CD	2004
051	Venomous Concept	Retroactive Abortion	CD	2004
052	Trevor Dunn's Trio-Convulsant	Sister Phantom Owl Fish	CD	2004
053	Flat Earth Society	Isms	CD	2004
054	Melvins + Lustmord	Pigs of the Roman Empire	CD	2004
055	Vincent & Mr. Green	Vincent & Mr. Green	CD	2004
056	Dälek	Absence	CD	2005
057	Isis	Panopticon	CD	2004
058	Kaada/Patton	Romances	CD	2004
059	Guapo	Black Oni	CD	2005
060	General Patton vs. The X-Ecutioners	General Patton vs. The X-Ecutioners	CD	2005
061	The Locust	Safety Second, Body Last	CD/LP	2005
062	Fantômas	Suspended Animation [limited edition]	CD	2005
063	Melvins	Mangled Demos from 1983	CD	2005
064	Orthrelm	OV	CD	2005
065	Fantômas	Suspended Animation	CD	2005
066	Ennio Morricone	Crime and Dissonance	CD	2005
067	Messer Chups	Crazy Price	CD	2005
068	East West Blast Test	Popular Music for Unpopular People	CD	2006
069	Mugison	Mugimama, Is This Monkey Music?	CD	2005
070	Ghostigital	In Cod We Trust	CD	2006
071	Mugison	Little Trip	CD	2006
072	Dälek/HAZE XXL	A Purge of Dissidents	DVD/CD	2007
073	Otto von Schirach	MaxiPad Detention	CD	2006
074	Mouse on Mars	Varcharz	CD	2006
075	The Tango Saloon	The Tango Saloon	CD	2006
076	Melvins	Houdini Live 2005: A Live History of Gluttony and Lust	CD	2006
077	Peeping Tom	Peeping Tom	CD	2006
078	The Golding Institute	Final Relaxation	CD	2006
079	Kaada	Music for Moviebikers	CD	2006
080	Isis	Clearing the Eye	DVD	2006
081	Isis	In the Absence of Truth	CD	2006
082	Melvins	(A) Senile Animal	CD	2006
083	Hella	There's No 666 in Outer Space	CD	2007
084	Dälek	Abandoned Language	CD	2007
085	Unsane	Visqueen	CD	2007
086	Goon Moon	Licker's Last Leg	CD	2007
087	Eyvind Kang	Athlantis	CD	2007
088	The Young Gods	Super Ready/Fragmenté	CD	2007
089	Tomahawk	Anonymous	CD	2007
090	Circus Devils	Sgt. Disco	CD	2007
091	Queens of the Stone Age	Era Vulgaris	10" LP	2007
092	Northern State	Can I Keep This Pen?	CD	2007
093	Qui	Love's Miracle	CD	2007
094	Imani Coppola	The Black & White Album	CD	2007
095	Isis	"Holy Tears"	CD single/LP	2008
096	Kaada/Patton	Live	DVD	2007
097	Dub Trio	Another Sound Is Dying	CD	2008
098	Brian Reitzell	30 Days of Night: OST	CD	2007
099	Isis	"Not in Rivers, but in Drops"	CD single	2008
100	Mike Patton	A Perfect Place	DVD/CD	2008
101	Farmers Market	Surfin' USSR	CD	2008
102	The Fantômas Melvins Big Band	Live from London 2006	DVD	2008
103	Tipsy	Buzzz	CD	2008
104	Mugison	Mugiboogie	CD	2008
105	Melvins	Nude with Boots	CD	2008
106	Zach Hill	Astrological Straits	CD	2008
107	Tanya Tagaq	Auk/Blood	CD	2008
108	Bohren & der Club of Gore	Dolores	CD	2008
109	Dälek	Gutter Tactics	CD	2009
110	Zu	Carboniferous	CD	2009
111	Eagles of Death Metal	Heart On	LP	2009
112	Melvins	The Bride Screamed Murder	CD	2010
113	Isis	Wavering Radiant	CD	2009
114	Sax Ruins	Yawiquo	CD	2009
115	MadLove	White With Foam	CD	2009
116	Melvins	Chicken Switch	CD	2009
117	Rob Swift	The Architect	CD	2009
118	Beak	Beak	CD	2009
119	Mike Patton	Mondo Cane	CD	2010
120	Daniele Luppi	Malos Habitos (Bad Habits)	CD	2011
121	Martina Topley-Bird	Some Place Simple	CD	2010
122	Mini Mansions	Mini Mansions	CD	2010
123	Alain Johannes	Spark	CD	2010
125	Gangpol & Mit	The 1000 Softcore Tourist People Club	CD	2011
126	Melvins	Sugar Daddy Live	CD	2011
127	The Book of Knots	Garden of Fainting Stars	CD	2011
128	Bohren & der Club of Gore	Beileid	CD	2011
129	Fantômas	The Director's Cut Live: A New Year's Revolution	CD	2011
130	Retox	Ugly Animals	CD	2011
131	Mike Patton	The Solitude of Prime Numbers [OST]	CD	2011
132	Eyvind Kang	The Narrow Garden	CD	2012
133	Mike Patton and Ictus Ensemble	Laborintus II	CD	2012
134	Portal 2 [OST]	Songs to Test By (Limited Edition)	4×CD	2012
135	Tomahawk	Eponymous to Anonymous	3×LP	2012
136	Melvins (lite)	Freak Puke	CD	2012
137	PHILM	Harmonic	??	2012
138	Guano Padano	2	??	2012
139	Palms	Palms	CD	2013
140	Isis	Temporal	2×CD, DVD	2012
141	Tomahawk	"Stone Letter"	7"	2012
142	Tomahawk	Oddfellows	CD	2013
143	Mark Lanegan / Duke Garwood	Black Pudding	CD	2013
144	Melvins	Everybody Loves Sausages	CD	2013
145	Isis	Celestial [reissue]	CD	2013
148	Isis	Oceanic (Remastered)	CD	2014
149	Mutation	Error 500l	CD	2013
150	Melvins	Tres Cabrones	CD	2013
155	Bohren & der Club of Gore	Piano Nights	CD	2014
156	The Unsemble	The Unsemble	CD	2014
158	Tomahawk	"M.E.A.T."	7-inch	2014
159	King Buzzo	This Machine Kills Artists	CD	2014
161	Le Butcherettes	Cry Is For The Flies	CD	2014
162	Sleaford Mods	Chubbed Up+	CD	2014
163	Guano Padano	Americana	CD	2014
164	The Melvins	Hold It In	CD	2014
RR-900	Faith No More	"Motherfucker"	7-inch	2014
166	Fantômas	Wunderkammer	5 LP, Cassette Tape	2014
167	Tetema	Geocidal	CD	2014
RR-1	Faith No More	"Superhero"	7-inch	2015
168	Zu	Cortar Todo	CD	2015
RR-2	Faith No More	Sol Invictus	CD	2015
169	The Melvins	Bulls and the Bees/Electroretard	CD	2015
170	Rolo Tomassi	Grievances	CD	2015
171	Mark Lanegan	Houston (Publishing Demos 2002)	CD	2015
172	Le Butcherettes	A Raw Youth	CD	2015
172DD	Le Butcherettes	A Raw Youth (Digital Deluxe)	Digital only	2016
173	Nevermen	Nevermen	CD	2016
174	Le Butcherettes	"Shave the Pride"	7-inch	2015
175	The Melvins	Across the USA in 51 Days: The Movie	DVD	2015
177	Kaada/Patton	Bacteria Cult	CD	2016
178	The Melvins	Basses Loaded	CD	2016
ORL1	Omar Rodriguez-Lopez	Sworn Virgins	Digital only	2016
ORL2	Omar Rodriguez-Lopez	Corazones	Digital only	2016
ORL3	Omar Rodriguez-Lopez	Blind Worms, Pious Swine	Digital only	2016
ORL4	Omar Rodriguez-Lopez	Arañas en La Sombra	Digital only	2016
ORL5	Omar Rodriguez-Lopez	Umbrella Mistress	Digital only	2016
ORL6	Omar Rodriguez-Lopez	El Bien Y Mal Nos Une	Digital only	2016
ORL7	Omar Rodriguez-Lopez	Cell Phone Bikini	Digital only	2016
ORL8	Omar Rodriguez-Lopez	Infinity Drips	Digital only	2016
ORL9	Omar Rodriguez-Lopez	Weekly Mansions	Digital only	2016
ORL10	Omar Rodriguez-Lopez	Zapopan	Digital only	2016
ORL11	Omar Rodriguez-Lopez	Nom De Guerre Cabal	Digital only	2016
ORL12	Omar Rodriguez-Lopez	Some Need It Lonely	Digital only	2016
ORL13	Omar Rodriguez-Lopez	A Lovejoy	Digital only	2016
ORL14	Omar Rodriguez-Lopez	Roman Lips	Digital only	2017
ORL15	Omar Rodriguez-Lopez	Zen Thrills	Digital only	2017
ORL16	Omar Rodriguez-Lopez	Chocolate Tumor Hormone Parade	Digital only	2017
180	Crystal Fairy	Crystal Fairy	CD	2017
ORL17	Omar Rodriguez-Lopez	Ensayo de un Desparecido	Digital only	2017
ORL18	Omar Rodriguez-Lopez	Azul Mis Dientes	Digital only	2017
ORL19	Omar Rodriguez-Lopez	Gorilla Preacher Cartel	Digital only	2017
191	Yasmine Hamdan	Al Jamilat	CD	2017
181	Isis (band)	Live VII 02.25.10	CD	2017
ORL20	Omar Rodríguez-López	Killing Tingled Lifting Retreats	Digital only	2017
182	Valve Studio Orchestra	Fight Songs: The Music of Team Fortress 2	CD	2017
ORL21	Omar Rodríguez-López	Solid State Mercenaries	Digital only	2017
ORL22	Omar Rodríguez-López	Birth of a Ghost	Digital only	2017
195	Melvins	A Walk With Love & Death	CD	2017
ORL23	Omar Rodríguez-López	Doom Patrol	Digital only	2017
196	Valve Studio Orchestra	The DOTA 2 Official Soundtrack	CD	2017
193	Dead Cross	Dead Cross	CD	2017
194	Dälek	Endangered Philosophies	CD	2017
192	Spotlights	Seismic	CD	2017
201	Melvins	Pinkus Abortion Technician	CD	2018
204	Dead Cross	Dead Cross EP	CD	2018
199	Split Cranium	I’m The Devil And I’m OK	CD	2018
202	Spotlights	Hanging by Faith EP	Digital only	2018
200	Mike Patton	1922 (Original Motion Picture Soundtrack)	CD	2018
207	Alain Johannes Trio	“Luna A Sol” (feat. Mike Patton)	Digital only	2018
SPOT2	Spotlights	Kiss The Ring (featuring Allen Epley of The Life and Times)	Digital only	2018
205	Daughters	You Won't Get What You Want	CD	2018
209	Planet B	Planet B	CD	2018
210	Spotlights	Love & Decay	CD	2019
211	Mike Patton & Jean-Claude Vannier	Corpse Flower	CD	2019
212	Imani Coppola	The Protagonist	Digital	2019
214	Cunts	Cunts	CD	2019
215	Human Impact	Human Impact	CD	2020
215DS5	Human Impact	Contact	Digital	2020
216D	Valve	Half-Life	Digital only	2020
217D	Valve	Half-Life 2	Digital only	2020
218	Bohren & Der Club of Gore	Patchouli Blue	CD	2020
219	tētēma	Necroscape	CD	2020
221	JG Thirlwell & Simon Steensland	Oscillospira	CD	2020
222	Alain Johannes	Hum	CD	2020
223	King Buzzo	Gift of Sacrifice	CD	2020
224D	Valve	Half-Life 2: Episode 1	Digital only	2020
224D2	Valve	Half-Life 2: Episode 2	Digital only	2020
226	Mr. Bungle	The Raging Wrath of the Easter Bunny Demo	CD	2020
227	Melvins	Hostile Ambient Takeover reissue	LP	2021
228	Melvins	(A) Senile Animal reissue	LP	2021
229	Melvins	Nude with Boots reissue	LP	2021
230	Melvins	The Bride Screamed Murder reissue	LP	2021
231	Melvins	Gluey Porch Treatments reissue	LP	2021
232	Isis	Oceanic reissue	LP	2021
233	Isis	Panopticon reissue	LP	2021
234	Melvins	Working with God	CD, LP	2021
235	Tomahawk	Tonic Immobility	CD, LP	2021
236	Mr. Bungle	The Night They Came Home	Blu-Ray, CD, DVD, LP, VHS	2021
237	Human Impact	EP01	LP	2021
238	Melvins	Five Legged Dog	CD, LP	2021
239	King Garbage	Heavy Metal Greasy Love	CD, LP	2022
240	Dälek	Precipice	CD, LP	2022
248	Dead Cross	II	CD, LP, Cassette	2022
249	Tomahawk	Tomahawk reissue	LP	2023
250	Tomahawk	Anonymous reissue	LP	2023
251	Tomahawk	Mit Gas reissue	LP	2023
252	Tomahawk	Oddfellows reissue	LP	2023
255	Melvins	The Birds and the Bees/Electroretard reissue	LP	2023
256	Melvins	Tres Cabrones reissue	LP	2023
257	Melvins	Houdini Live 2005: A Live History of Gluttony and Lust reissue	LP	2023
258	Peeping Tom	Peeping Tom reissue	LP	2023
260	The Bobby Lees	Bellevue	CD, LP, Cassette	2023
262	Oxbow	Love's Holiday	CD, LP	2023
263	Spotlights	Alchemy for the Dead	CD, LP	2023
265	Dave Lombardo	Rites of Percussion	CD, LP	2023
266	Palms	Palms reissue	LP	2023
267	Venera	Venera	CD, LP	2023
268	Isis (band)	Mosquito Control / The Red Sea	LP	2023
275	General Patton vs. The X-Ecutioners	General Patton vs. The X-Ecutioners reissue	LP	2024
276	Melvins	Tarantula Heart	CD	2024
278	CNTS	Thoughts & Prayers	CD, LP	
