= Kaada & The Late Bloomers in Concert =

2012 live album by Kaada

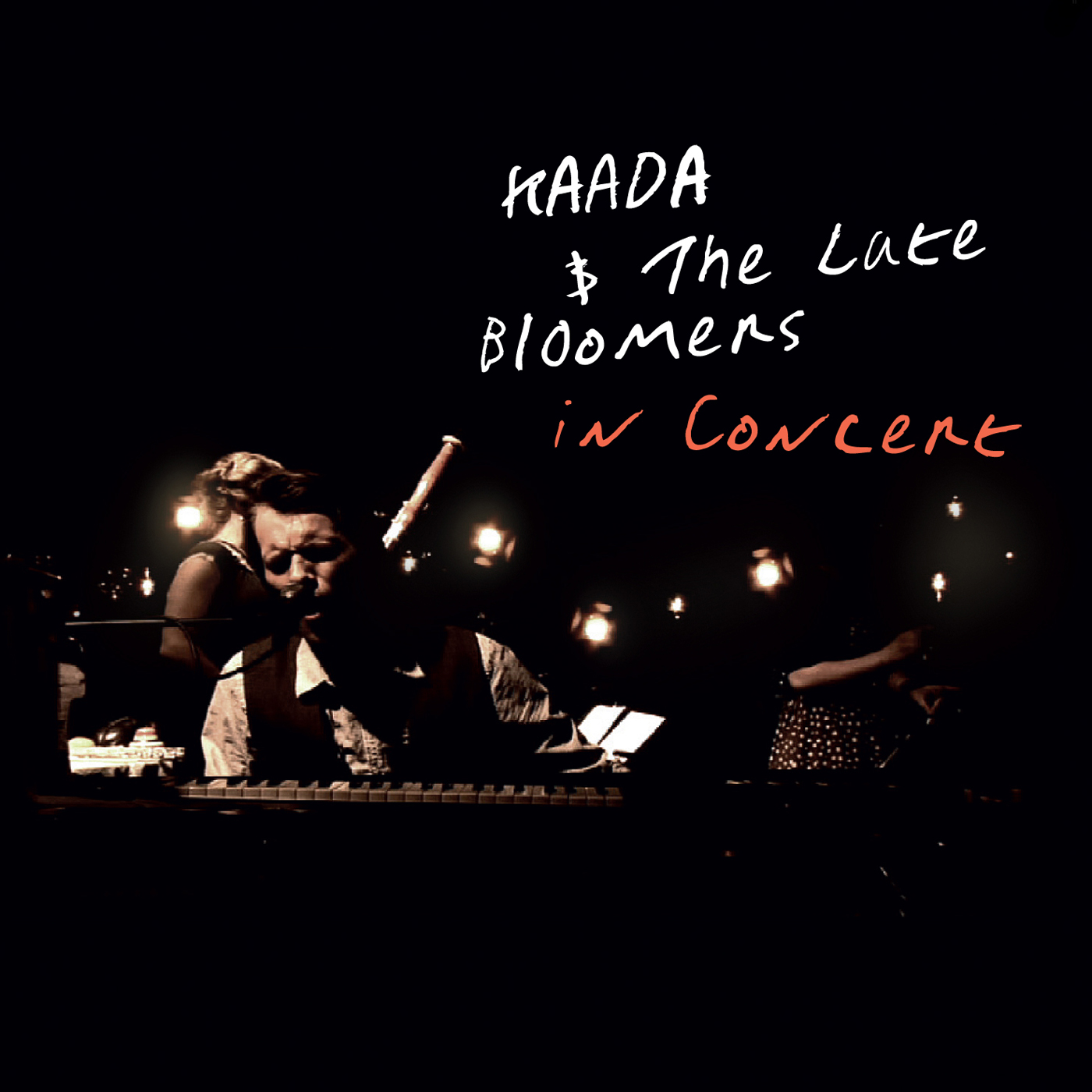

Live album by Kaada
- Released: 22 August 2012
- Genres: Instrumental soundtrack, alternative rock, experimental
- Length: 61:39
- Labels: Kaada Recordings (KAAA-017)
- Producer: Kaada

Kaada chronology
Junkyard Nostalgias (2006)	Kaada & The Late Bloomers in Concert (2012)

Kaada & The Late Bloomers in Concert is the fifth solo album by Norwegian pop and experimental artist, Kaada.

== Track listing ==
All tracks are written by Kaada.

No.	Title	Length
1.	"From here on it got rough"	3:53
2.	"Smiger"	4:40
3.	"Celibate"	5:56
4.	"Hammering down the nails"	3:42
5.	"Truth serum"	4:37
6.	"Mainstreaming"	4:12
7.	"The mosquito and the old abandoned old woman"	6:40
8.	"No you don't"	7:31
9.	"A day and a night and a day"	4:14
10.	"Spindle"	5:46
11.	"Hungarian kiss"	2:53
12.	"Invocation"	2:54
13.	"Dragging an ox"	4:10
Total length:		61:39

== Personnel ==
- John Erik Kaada – saw, harps, keys, vocals
- Hanne Rekdal – flute, bassoon, vocals
- Sigrun Tara Øverland – harps, glocks, vocals
- Jane Helen Johansen – guitars, vocals
- Guro Skumsnes Moe – double bass, vocals
- Renate Engevold – violin, perc, vocals
- Børge Fjordheim – drums, saw, marimba, vocals
- Børre Mølstad – tuba, theremin, vocals
- Espen Alexander Husby – recording and sound engineer
- Hårek Kristoffersen – recording engineer
- Martin Kvamme – cover design
