= Halloween Party =

A Halloween party is a social event, typically a costume party held around Halloween.

Halloween Party may also refer to:

- Hallowe'en Party, 1969 novel by Agatha Christie
- The Halloween Party, 1974 children's book by Lonzo Anderson
- Halloween Party (Fear Street), 1990 book by R. L. Stine
- Halloween Party (album), 2003 release by Pink Anvil
- "Halloween Party" (song), 2012 release by Halloween Junky Orchestra
- "Fancy Dress", an episode of The Wind in the Willows
- "Halloween Party" (Squid Game), 2024 episode of Squid Game
