= Cloroform =

Norwegian alternative rock band

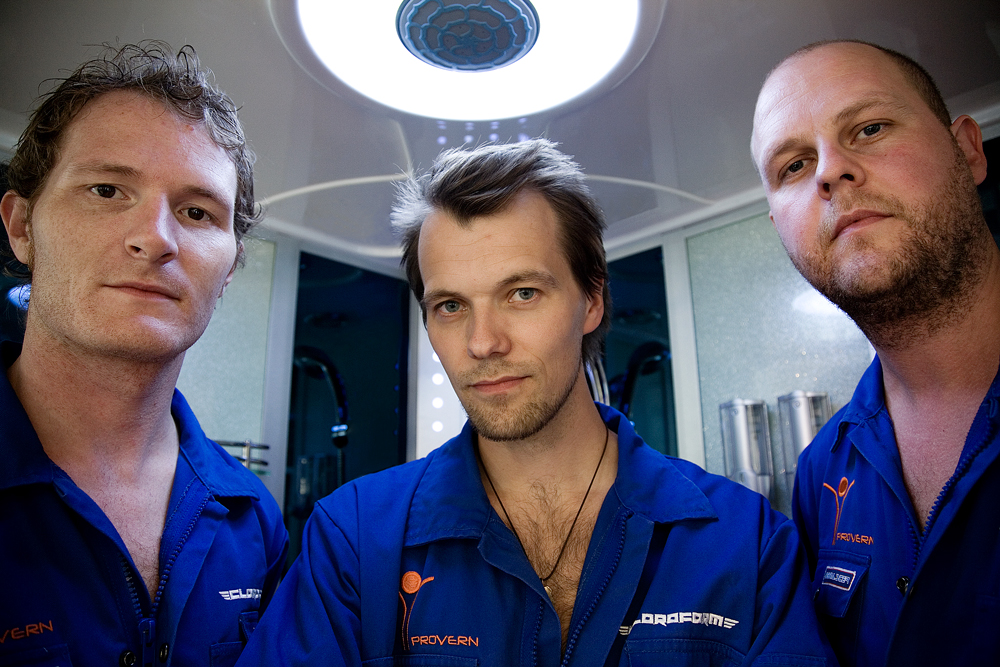
- from left : Fjordheim, Kaada, Storesund

Background information
- Origin: Stavanger, Norway
- Genres: Alternative rock, electronica, acid jazz, rock
- Years active: 1998—present
- Label: Kaada Recordings
- Members: John Erik Kaada; Øyvind Storesund; Børge Fjordheim
- Website: http://www.cloroform.com

Cloroform is a Norwegian alternative rock band that formed in 1998 in Stavanger. They started out as an acoustic jazz trio, but soon went on to sound more like a rock band. In the later years they have experimented with noise and avant-garde related genres.

== Other projects ==
The three members of Cloroform are multifunctional musicians. In addition to Cloroform, they possess several other projects in their charge.

Børge Fjordheim has been a co-producer and composer for several of Norway's leading pop acts, including Sivert Høyem, Morten Abel, and Lene Marlin. He has also co-composed and produced the song "Can't Beat the Feeling" on Kylie Minogue album Aphrodite, released in 2010.

Øyvind Storesund is one of Norway's most respected free-jazz avant-garde bassists, and is the bassplayer of Kaizers Orchestra.

John Erik Kaada has released solo albums and is one of Norway's most renowned composers. He has scored several international motion pictures.

== Visual identity ==
The band's logo was designed by Martin Kvamme of Unit Delta Plus.

== Discography ==
- Deconstruction (Kaada Records, 1998)
- All-Scars (Kaada Records, 1998)
- Do the Crawl (Kaada Records, 2000)
- Scrawl (Kaada Records, 2001)
- Hey You Let's Kiss (Kaada Records, 2003)
- Cracked Wide Open (Kaada Records, 2005)
- Clean (Kaada Records, 2007)
- Grrr (Kaada Records, 2016)
- Overtredelse (Mirakel, 2021)
