= Frode Gjerstad =

Norwegian jazz musician

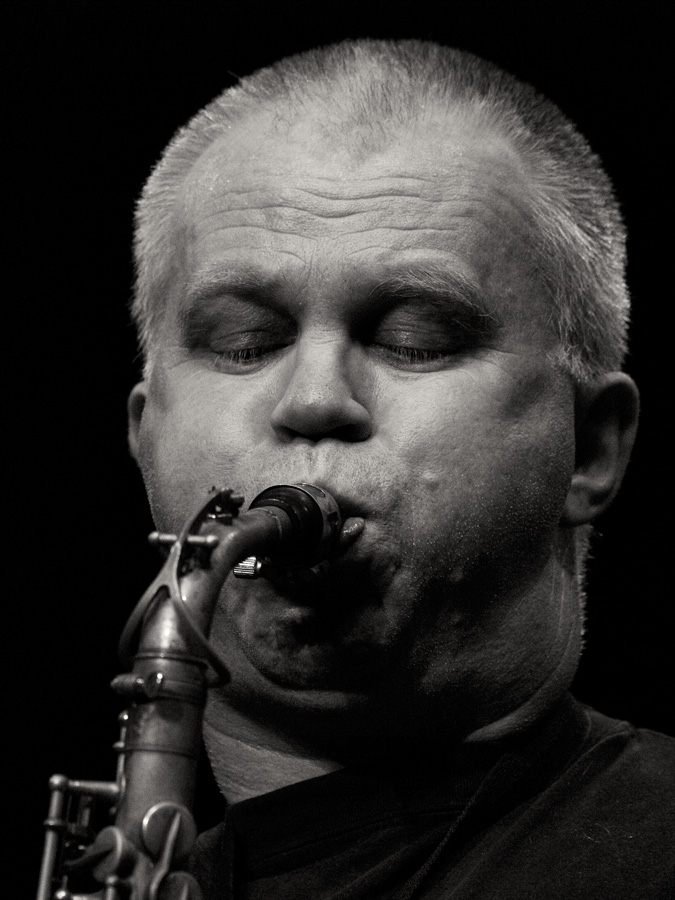
- Gjerstad during the Moers Festival in Germany, 2008

Background information
- Born: 24 March 1948 (age 78); Stavanger, Rogaland, Norway
- Genre: Jazz
- Occupation: Musician
- Instruments: Saxophone, clarinet, flute
- Website: frodegjerstad.com

Frode Gjerstad (born 24 March 1948) is a Norwegian jazz musician with alto saxophone as principal instrument, but he also plays other saxophones, clarinet, and flute. He has collaborated with Paal Nilssen-Love, Borah Bergman, Peter Brötzmann, Evan Parker, Derek Bailey, Bjørn Kjellemyr, Terje Isungset, William Parker, Sabir Mateen, John Stevens, Johnny Dyani, Kent Carter, and since 1979 has contributed to more than 50 recordings.

== Career ==
Gjerstad played in the trio Detail together with the British drummer John Stevens, in the period 1981–1994, and they released fourteen albums. Other members of the band were the pianist Eivin One Pedersen (1981–82) and the mega bassist's Johnny Dyani (1981–1986) or Kent Carter (1987–1994).

In 1985, he initiated "Circulasione Totale Orchestra", a band with varying lineups, where young musicians, mostly from Stavanger, could get a chance. To the Moldejazz 1989 he composed the commissioned work Dancemble which was performed by a 13-man version of the band. The band was active until 1995 and produced three recordings. In 1998, the band reemerged and released the album Borealis.

He also collaborated with numerous musicians in various small groups, which has resulted in several albums, tours and festival recordings in Norway, United States and Europe. The most long-lasting partnership in recent years is the current issue of Gjerstad Trio where he plays with drummer Paal Nilssen-Love and bassist Øyvind Storesund. They debuted at Nattjazz in Bergen 1999 and have released five albums.

== Honors ==
- 1996: Jazz Musician of the Year by "Foreningen norske jazzmusikere"
- 2008: "Buddyprisen"
- 2010: "Stavanger kommunes kulturpris"

== Discography ==
=== Solo albums ===
- 1998: Ism (Circulasione Totale)

=== As front man ===
Frode Gjerstad and the Circulasione Totale Orchestra

- 1998: Borealis (Cadence)

With John Stevens, Derek Bailey

- 2001: Hello Goodbye (Emanem)

With Terje Isungset

- 2002: Shadows and Light (FMR)

With Peter Brötzmann

- 2003: Soria Moria (FMR)

With John Edwards & Mark Sanders

- 2003: The Welsh Chapel (Cadence)

With Derek Bailey

- 2003: Nearly A D (Emanem)

With Steve Hubback

- 2003: Demystify (FMR)
- 2005: One Foot Moving (Utech)

With Lasse Marhaug

- 2003: Tou (FMR)

With Paul Hession

- 2004: May Day (FMR)

With Kevin Norton

- 2004: No Definitive (FMR)
- 2011: Tipples (FMR) with David Watson
- 2013: Live Tipple (FMR) with David Watson

With Anders Hana, Morten Olsen, Per Zanussi

- 2003: Born To Collapse (Circulasione Totale)

With Sabir Mateen

- 2005: Good Question (FMR)

With John Stevens

- 2005: Keep On Playing (FMR)

With Nils Henrik Asheim

- 2005: The Shortest Night (FMR)

With Jeffrey Hayden Shurdut - The Organic Plastic Band

- 2006: We Are As Organic As Cars (Nolabel)

With Daniel Carter, Jeffrey Hayden Shurdut

- 2006: Behind the White Fences (Nolabel)

With Eivind One Pedersen, Kevin Norton

- 2006: The Walk (FMR)

With Fred Lonberg-Holm

- 2006: The Cello Quartet (FMR), including with Amit Sen, Paal Nilssen-Love - The Cello Quartet
- 2010: Sugar Maple (FMR), including with Michael Zerang
- 2011: Tistel (FMR)

With Paal Nilssen-Love

- 2007: Day Before One (Tyyfus)
- 2010: Gromka (Not Two)
- 2012: Side By Side (CIMP)

With William Parker & Hamid Drake

- 2008: On Reade Street (FMR)

With John Edwards / Mark Sanders

- 2009: Bergen (FMR)

With Nick Stephens

- 2012: Different Times (Loose Torque)

With Skaset _ Tafjord _ Mølstad _ Moe

- 2013: Deichman (Conrad Sound)

With Luis Conte

- 2013: Mirrors Edges (FMR)

=== Collaborations ===
Within Detail

- 1983: Backwards and Forwards / Forwards And Backwards (Impetus Records), with Johnny Dyani and John Stevens

In trio with Rashid Bakr and William Parker

- 1996: Seeing New York From The Ear (Cadence)

With John Stevens

- 1996: Sunshine (Impetus)

With Peter Brötzmann

- 1999: Invisible Touch (Cadence )

With Borah Bergman

- 2003: Rivers in Time (FMR)

With Jeffrey Shurdut

- 2004: Everything Is Divisible By 1 (Nolabel)

With Lasse Marhaug

- 2004: Red Edge (CD) Breathmint, Carbon Records, Little Mafia Records, Sunship Records, Gameboy Records 2004

With Bobby Bradford

- 2009: Reknes (Circulasione Totale), including with Ingebrigt Håker Flaten + Paal Nilssen-Love
- 2012: Kampen (NoBusiness), including with Ingebrigt Håker Flaten, Paal Nilssen-Love
- 2012: Dragon (PNL), including with Paal Nilssen-Love
- 2014: Silver Cornet (Nessa), including with Ingebrigt Håken Flaten, and Frank Rosaly

With Bennink

- 2009: Han & Frode (Cadence)

With Sabir Mateen feat. Steve Swell

- 2010: Sound Gathering (Not Two )

With Motland / Lonberg-Holm / Solberg

- 2011: VC/DC (Hispid)

With Fred Lonberg-Holm

- 2014: Life On Sandpaper (FMR)

With Louis Moholo

- 2014: Sult (FMR)
- 2015: Distant Groove (FMR), including with Nick Stephens, Fred Lonberg-Holm

Awards
Preceded by Jon Larsen	Recipient of the Buddyprisen; 2008	Succeeded by Dag Arnesen
