= Ataxia (disambiguation) =

Ataxia is a neurological sign consisting of lack of voluntary coordination of muscle movements that includes gait abnormality.

Ataxia may also refer to:

- Ataxia (beetle), a genus of longhorn beetles
- Ataxia, a genus of plants, synonym of Anthoxanthum
- Ataxia (band), a supergroup featuring John Frusciante (of the Red Hot Chili Peppers), Joe Lally (of Fugazi), and Josh Klinghoffer (ex guitarist of the Red Hot Chili Peppers)
- Ataxia (album), a 2008 studio album by the alternative rock band Circus Devils
- "Ataxia", a song from the 2010 studio album Invade by the metal band Within the Ruins
- Ataxia, the name of a professional wrestling move used by Austin Theory
