= Sigrun Tara Øverland =

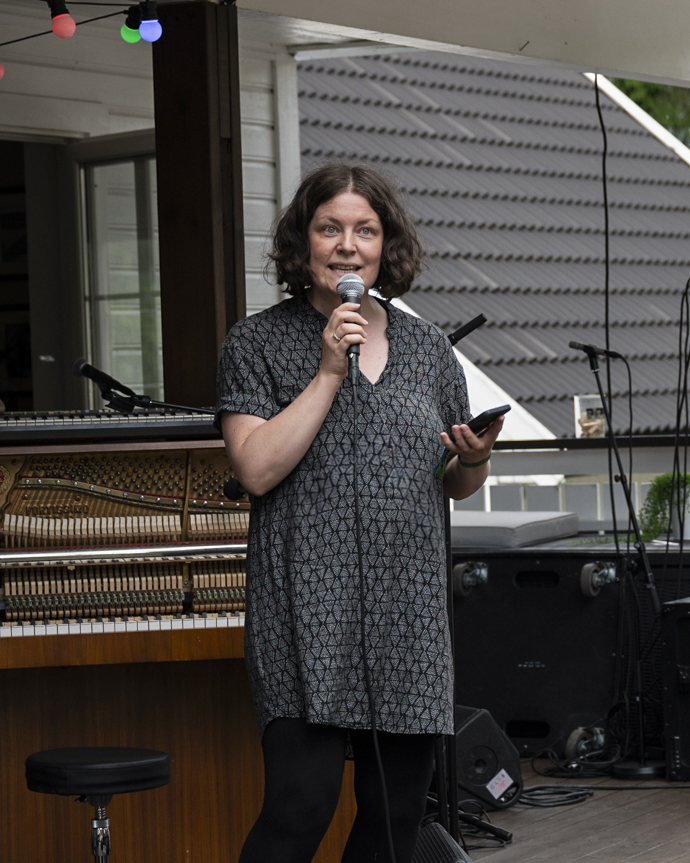

Background information
- Born: 24 December 1983 (age 42); Kristiansand, Norway
- Occupations: Musician, songwriter, music producer
- Instruments: Vocals, guitar, lyre, autoharp, multi-instrumentalist
- Labels: NorCD
- Website: www.sigruntara.no

Sigrun Tara Øverland (born 24 December 1983 in Kristiansand Municipality, Norway) is a Norwegian musician (vocals, guitar, lyre, autoharp, among others), lyricist, songwriter and music producer.

== Career ==
Øverland graduated in music performance at the Agder University College (2003–05), where she initiated the band Tara (established 2003) with Guro Skumsnes Moe and Gunnar Sæter, and the duo Picidae (established 2004) with Eirik Dørsdal, both bands with album releases. She has also participated in other projects like Kaada, Anne Marie Almedal, and Evan Seleven.

After further studies in administration at the Norwegian Academy of Music, she was general manager of AKKS in Oslo, a music organization working balance in the music industry. She has also been head of the concert association Havre backpack. She now works as a producer for the cultural center Kulturfabrikken in Sortland Municipality, Norway.

== Discography ==
=== Fronting ===
With Tara

- 2006: Plain As Coal (Bergland Production)

With Picidae

- 2016: It's Another Wor d (NorCD)

=== Backing ===
With Novac.

- 2004: Sex, Drugs & Ragtime (self-released)

With Anne Marie Almedal

- 2007: The Siren And The Sage (+47, Warner Music Norway), on the tune "Joy"
- 2010: Blue Sky Blue (+47), on the tune "Seize My Heart"
- 2010: Memory Lane (+47), on the tune "May You Never"
