= Closing Statements =

Studio album by Kaada
- Released: 25 May 2018
- Genres: Instrumental soundtrack; alternative rock; experimental
- Length: 46:54
- Label: Mirakel Recordings
- Producer: Kaada

Kaada chronology
Junkyard Nostalgias (2009)	Closing Statements (2018)

Kaada Closing Statements is a solo album by Norwegian pop/experimental Kaada, released on 25 May 2018 on Mirakel Recordings. Closing Statements is a concept album based on mortality. “The titles are quotes and fragments from different farewell utterances... things that people said when they were about to die,” he noted in the album press release.

== Track listing ==
All tracks are written by Kaada.

No.	Title	Length
1.	"It Must Have Been The Coffee"	4:42
2.	"Farewell"	4:50
3.	"Everything Is An Illusion"	4:03
4.	"Unknown Destination"	4:07
5.	"Wonder Out Loud"	0:43
6.	"On The Contrary"	5:34
7.	"Useless,Useless"	4:15
8.	"Clearing Out"	3:54
9.	"More Light"	4:51
10.	"Hey Unfair, That Was My Exit"	4:17
11.	"Home In The Dark"	5:38
Total length:		46:54
