= Baard Owe =

Norwegian actor (1936–2017)

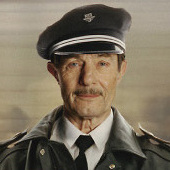
- Owe in O' Horten (2007)
- Born: July 3, 1936; Mosjøen
- Died: November 11, 2017 (aged 81); Copenhagen
- Occupation: Actor
- Notable work: The Kingdom; Hotellet; Gertrud; O' Horten; Good Favour

Baard Arne Owe (3 July 1936, Mosjøen, Norway – 11 November 2017, aged 81, Copenhagen, Denmark), sometimes credited Bård Owe, was a Norwegian-born Danish actor who appeared in many Scandinavian films and television series.

Owe was born in Norway in 1936. He was educated at the National School of Theater in Oslo and apprenticed at the Aalborg Theatre until 1958. He performed in the Eurovision Song Contest 1962, after which his career grew.

Owe is mostly known for his roles in the television series The Kingdom and Hotellet. He was also noted for his roles in films such as Gertrud and O' Horten. His final performances were in the Danish film C4 and the English film Good Favour.

Owe was married to actress Marie-Louise Coninck, with whom he had four children. Owe died of lung cancer at his home aged 81 on 11 November 2017.
