= O' Horten =

2007 film by Bent Hamer

- Norwegian film poster
- Directed by: Bent Hamer
- Written by: Bent Hamer
- Produced by: Bent Hamer
- Starring: Bård Owe; Espen Skjønberg; Ghita Nørby; Henny Moan
- Cinematography: John Christian Rosenlund
- Edited by: Pål Gengenbach
- Music by: Kaada
- Production company: Bulbul Films
- Distributed by: Scanbox (Norway)
- Release date: 26 December 2007 (Norway)
- Running time: 90 minutes
- Countries: Norway; France; Germany; Denmark
- Language: Norwegian
- Box office: $216,262

O' Horten is a 2007 internationally co-produced comedy-drama film written and directed by Bent Hamer. The film's title character Odd Horten is a habit-bound train driver, who is about to retire. On the day of his retirement he ends up in an unexpected situation, and is forced to reconsider his life. As in other films by Hamer, the themes are loneliness and old age, and the courage to take chances. O' Horten has been described as a film without a strong plot or a clear chronology.

The film's main cast consists mainly of senior Danish and Norwegian actors, including Bård Owe, Espen Skjønberg, and Ghita Nørby. There are also several cameos from various well-known Norwegians, such as ski jumper Anette Sagen in her first film role. The music was composed by John Erik Kaada. Generally well received by critics, it was chosen for Un Certain Regard at the Cannes Film Festival. Skjønberg was awarded an Amanda Award for Best Actor in a Supporting Role.

== Plot ==
Odd Horten is an overcautious 67-year-old man about to retire after forty years as a train driver on the route between Oslo and Bergen. As he awakes, he goes through a meticulous daily routine, as he prepares for his second-to-last time driving the train to Bergen. When he gets there, he makes small talk with Svea, who owns the boarding house where he stays when there and whom he now may never see again.

Back in Oslo, his colleagues throw him a farewell party, but Odd—a timid man—is uncomfortable with the attention. As the party moves to a co-worker's apartment, he ends up getting accidentally locked out. He climbs up a scaffold, trying to reach the apartment window, and ends up in a young boy's room. The boy asks him to stay and wait for him to fall asleep, but Odd falls asleep first. He oversleeps in the unfamiliar room and arrives too late for the train he was to drive on his final working day. He is left standing on the platform without any fixed points in his life, with nothing but a life of emptiness stretching out before him.

A number of scenes then follow whose exact sequence is unclear. Odd goes to visit his mother at the retirement home, which only makes him more unhappy: his mother is senile and spends her days staring emptily out the window, and the visit reminds him of his own impending old age. While Odd is at a restaurant, police come in and arrest the cook. At the shop where he normally buys his pipe tobacco, he learns that the owner has died. He decides to sell his boat, leading to misadventures when the buyer, who works at an airport, asks Odd to meet him there inside the secure zone. Odd goes to the local swimming pool, but his shoes were removed when the facility closed; as he is leaving, he finds a pair of red high-heeled boots and walks away in them.

By chance he then runs into another man his age, the far more spontaneous Trygve Sissener, who has fallen asleep in the snow-covered street. The two spend the evening in conversation over a few drinks at Sissener's house, and Odd is led to realisations about his own life. It emerges that his mother—a free-spirited woman—was a ski jumper, but Odd himself never had the courage to try the sport. He now feels as if he has let her down, by never having the courage to seize the day and try new things.

In the early morning Sissener suggests the two go driving blindfolded. The stunt goes surprisingly well, but as Sissener pulls over the car, he dies. Odd is now left with responsibility for Sissener's dog and with an urgency to live life to the fullest. He makes his way up to the Holmenkollen ski jump, where he sees a vision of his mother as a young woman, doing the jump. He comes to a decision and starts to do the ski jump. Odd, for the first time no longer wearing his railwayman's jacket, rides the train to Bergen, where Svea is happily waiting for him on the platform.

== Main cast ==
- Bård Owe as Odd Horten: The "O" in O' Horten stands for "Odd". The name "Odd" is a quite common boys' name in Norway, and does not carry the same meaning as the English word "odd", though the film and the character's bizarre qualities have been pointed out by some. Though not intentionally meant as a pun, Hamer himself has said: "I know the meaning of the word in English, and that doesn't hurt". Born in Norway, Owe has spent most of his professional career in Denmark, where he is known to a contemporary audience primarily from Lars von Trier's The Kingdom. His career, however, goes all the way back to Carl Theodor Dreyer's classic Gertrude from 1964. Owe has also done much theatre and television work, yet after acting in over thirty films, this was his first leading role.
- Espen Skjønberg as Trygve Sissener: Trygve lives alone in one of the finer parts of Oslo, and when he meets Odd he is happy to have someone to share a few drinks with. Skjønberg had been a presence in Norwegian theatre and film since 1945, and debuted on film as a child, as early as 1937. He received several awards, among them an honorary Amanda in 2004.
- Ghita Nørby as Mrs. Deinboll: Mrs. Deinboll works at the store where Odd buys his tobacco. Nørby is a well-established actress in Denmark, where she has been referred to as "the first lady of Danish theatre". She had also worked in Norway prior to O' Horten; in 1996 she played the role of Marie Hamsun in the film Hamsun.
- Henny Moan as Svea: Henny Moan plays the part of the old lady who owns the boarding house where Odd lives when he is in Bergen. There is a special connection between the two. Moan has acted in films since 1955, and at the time O' Horten was made, she had just retired from a long career at the theatre.
- Bjørn Floberg as Flo
- Kai Remlov as Steiner Sissener
- Per Jansen as Train driver
- Bjarte Hjelmeland as Conductor
- Trond Viggo Torgersen as Opsahl
- Anette Sagen as Young Vera Horten

== Production ==
The film contains several cameos from well-known actors and other celebrities, made possible by Hamer's high standing as a director. His previous film was the international production Factotum, based on the novel by Charles Bukowski, starring Matt Dillon, Lili Taylor, and Marisa Tomei. Some of the appearances are relatively brief; Nørby, for instance, is on screen for less than three minutes, while the well-known Norwegian entertainer Trond Viggo Torgersen appears for only 59 seconds. Before the film's première on Boxing Day 2007, a pre-screening was held for journalists on 22 December. This was followed by dinner, attended by all the protagonists, at the restaurant Valkyrien in Oslo, where Odd Horten is also a regular customer in the film.

Among the more original castings was Anette Sagen, the world's leading female ski jumper, in her first film role. Sagen, 22 at the time, played the part of 70-year-old Owe's ski jumping mother, although in a younger incarnation. Hamer had already considered Sagen for the role, when he ran into her by chance at the Holmenkollen Ski Museum. Without knowing to whom he was talking, Hamer mentioned that he was shooting a film in this location, and was planning to ask Anette Sagen to be in it. The reason the theme of ski jumping was chosen was that Hamer's own mother performed the sport, and the film has been described as a tribute to all female ski jumpers. Sagen herself had also earlier been involved in a controversy over women's access to professional venues and competitions. Incidentally, Sagen and Owe are also both from the Norwegian town of Mosjøen.

The two lonely old men make part of a recurring theme in Hamer's films, as seen also in Eggs (1995) and Kitchen Stories (2003). However, Hamer himself has described the film as equally much about women; "the women who once gave birth to these men". He also cites a great fascination with trains as an inspiration for the film's setting, and claims that he had long wanted to make a film with this theme.

== Reception ==
Norwegian newspapers Verdens Gang and Dagbladet both gave the film five out of six points. Verdens Gang's Jon Selås called it "a little film about living" and praised it for its "applied existential philosophy". Dagbladet's Vegard Larsen had certain objections to a few unnecessary scenes, but nevertheless found that the film had met the high expectations created by Hamer's previous films. Aftenposten's Ingunn Økland, on the other hand, felt O' Horten failed to live up to the director's best work, and gave it only four points. She nevertheless pointed out the good qualities in the film, in particular the filming and the soundtrack by John Erik Kaada.

Foreign reviewers also gave the film generally positive reviews; Duane Byrge of The Hollywood Reporter called it a "Warm story from frigid Norway". Variety's Alissa Simon wrote that it "lacks the fully developed characters and tightly constructed narrative of his more poignant and substantial Kitchen Stories", but that it "nevertheless provides a warm and gently humorous divertissement". She also found the production and score excellent. James Rocchi, writing for Cinematical, chose to highlight Bård Owe's performance, and his "warm demeanor" and meticulous "capacity for double-takes". Entertainment Weekly's Lisa Schwarzbaum compared Owe to Jack Nicholson's Warren Schmidt in the film About Schmidt. Like others, she also used Finnish director Aki Kaurismäki as a reference to describe Hamer's particular cinematic style.

O' Horten was picked for the Un Certain Regard-section of the Cannes Film Festival. Here it was praised by one reviewer as "deliciously funny" in a festival that contained few happy stories. This marked the fourth time that Hamer was represented at Cannes, which makes him one of only two Norwegians to accomplish this feat. This instance, however, marked a step up for Hamer, as his previous appearances had been in the slightly less prestigious Directors' Fortnight-category. At the festival, the film was picked for international distribution by the distribution company Sony Pictures Classics. Hamer also won the Norwegian Film Critics' Award in 2008, thereby becoming the first director to win this award three times. At the Amanda Awards that year, O' Horten was nominated for a number of awards – including "Best Film" and "Best Direction" – but won only two: "Best Sound" and "Best Actor in a Supporting Role" for Espen Skjønberg.

In spite of good critical reception, the film did not perform very well at the box office, with only about 35,000 tickets sold domestically. Hamer expressed some disappointment with this, while hoping that the DVD-release would fare better. Internationally, the film did somewhat better, and was sold to forty countries. By early August 2009, the film had in fact been seen by more people in the United States than in Norway.

== Soundtrack ==
The soundtrack to the film was fully composed by Norwegian pop/experimental singer Kaada.
