= Øyvind Storesund =

Norwegian rock and jazz musician

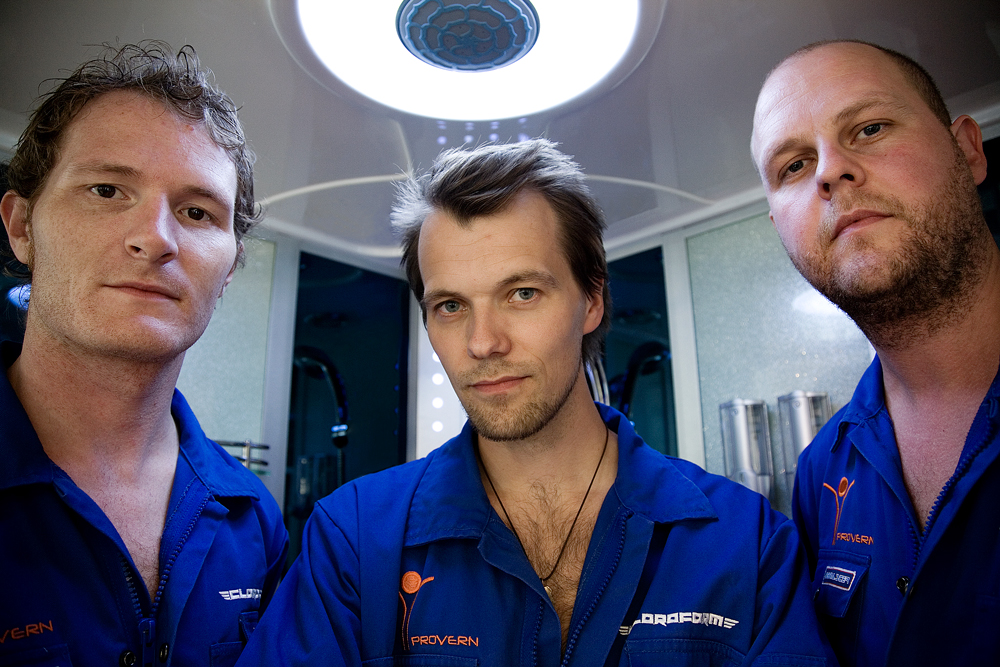
- Øyvind Storesund (right) as part of the band Cloroform in 2011

Background information
- Birth name: Øyvind Storesund
- Also known as: Oyvind Storesund
- Born: 9 March 1974 (age 51)
- Origin: Bø i Telemark, Telemark, Norway
- Genres: Experimental music rock
- Occupation: Musician
- Instrument(s): Vocals, upright bass
- Years active: 1994–present

Øyvind Storesund (born 9 March 1975 in Bø i Telemark, Norway) is a Norwegian Rock and jazz musician (upright bass) known from playing in the Norwegian bands Cloroform and Kaizers Orchestra.

== Career ==
Storesund replaced the former bassist Jon Sjøen in the band Kaizers Orchestra, and is also a driving force on the free-jazz Avant-Garde scene, playing with Paal Nilssen-Love, Pauline Oliveros and Frode Gjerstad releasing the album This Is Not Sweden (2007), together with Peter Brötzmann.

== Discography ==
With The Silver Voices

- 1997: Songs We Love So Dear (Lynor Records)

With Cloroform

- 1998: Deconstruction (KAAARec)
- 1999: Do The Crawl (Bergland Production)
- 1999: All – Scars (KAAARec)
- 2003: Hey You Let's Kiss (KAAARec)
- 2005: Cracked Wide Open (KAAARec)

With Frode Gjerstad & the Circulasione Totale Orchestra

- 1998: Borealis (Cadence Jazz Records)

With Wunderkammer

- 1999: Wunderkammer (Plateselskapet Skarv)
- 2002: Today I Cannot Hear Music (HoneyMilk Records)

With Frode Gjerstad Trio

- 2001: The Blessing Light: For John Stevens (Cadence Jazz Records)
- 2002: Last First (Falçata-Galia, Transparency)
- 2003: St. Louis (FMR Records)
- 2003: Sharp Knives Cut Deeper (Splasc(h) Records), with Peter Brötzmann
- 2006: Mothers & Fathers & (Circulasione Totale)
- 2006: Nothing Is Forever (Circulasione Totale)

With Kaada

- 2001: Thank You For Giving Me Your Valuable Time (EMI Records)
- 2004: MECD (Warner Music, Norway)
- 2004: Natural Born Star (KAAARec), Music From The Motion Picture

With Kaada/Patton

- 2004: Romances (Ipecac Recordings)
- 2007: Live (Ipecac Recordings)

With Kaizers Orchestra

- 2005: Maestro (Kaizerecords)
- 2011: Live i Oslo Spektrum (Petroleum Records, Monster)
- 2013: En Aften I Operaen (Petroleum Records, Monster)

With Boschamaz

- 2007: This Is Not Sweden (Hecca Records)

=== Film music ===
With Kaada music from the Motion Picture

- 2007: Natural Born Star (KAAARec)
- 2008: O' Horten (KAAARec)
