= When Machines Attack =

2013 album by Circus Devils

Studio album by Circus Devils
- Released: 2013
- Genre: Experimental rock, alternative rock, psychedelic rock
- Label: Happy Jack Rock Records / Rockathon Records
- Producer: Todd Tobias

Circus Devils chronology
Capsized! (2002)	When Machines Attack (2013)	My Mind Has Seen The White Trick (2013)

Professional ratings
Review scores
Source	Rating
The Fire Note	3/5 stars

When Machines Attack is the tenth studio album from the American psychedelic rock trio Circus Devils. The album, which has an abrasive, aggressive sound, was released in 2013, in conjunction with the album My Mind Has Seen the White Trick, which in contrast to When Machines Attack, has a gentler music style. All songs were written and performed by Robert Pollard, Todd Tobias and Tim Tobias.

== Reception ==
On behalf of SLUG Magazine, Brian Staker wrote,

The track 'We’re Going Inside the Head (Of A Winner)' transforms from a somniloquent recitation into an aural assault. A song like “The Lamb Gets Even (inst)” recalls early British prog rock in its sound as well as title. The genre is one of Pollard's “Four Ps” of musical influence (the other three are: punk, pop and psych)—they all become convoluted in fascinating ways under the sign of Circus Devils.

The Fire Note's Christopher Anthony added,

The album is full of vocal trickery which gives it a more robotic feel when it’s paired with the very deliberate sound movements that create the song structures. Looming large drums, chaotic excited vocals and injected sound effects sum up When Machines Attack. It is an engaging record that keeps you at arm’s length as its interesting soundscapes still give you a chill.

== Track listing ==
1. "Beyond the Sky"
2. "You're Not a Police Car"
3. "Bad Earthman"
4. "Idiot Tree"
5. "Arrival at Low Volume Submarine"
6. "Craftwork Man"
7. "Blood Dummies"
8. "When Machines Attack"
9. "Wizard Hat Lost in the Stars"
10. "Johnny Dart"
11. "We're Going Inside the Head (of a Winner)"
12. "Brain of the Iron Fist"
13. "Let Us Walk With Monsters"
14. "The Horrified Flower"
15. "Doberman Wasp"
16. "The Lamb Gets Even (inst.)"
17. "Centerverse"
18. "We Shall Soon Discover"
19. "Beyond the Sky (part 2)"
