= Bacteria Cult =

2016 studio album by Kaada/Patton

Studio album by Kaada/Patton
- Released: April 1, 2016
- Studio: Fartein Valen (Stavanger); Wrongroom (Oslo)
- Genre: Experimental rock
- Length: 32:38
- Label: Ipecac

Kaada/Patton chronology
Kaada/Patton Live (2007)	Bacteria Cult (2016)

Bacteria Cult is the second studio album by musical duo Kaada/Patton. It was released on April 1, 2016 via Ipecac Recordings.

== Critical reception ==
Professional ratings
Aggregate scores
Source	Rating
Metacritic	80/100
Review scores
Source	Rating
AllMusic	4/5 stars
Punknews.org	4/5 stars
Record Collector	4/5 stars
The Line of Best Fit	7/10

Bacteria Cult was met with generally favourable reviews from music critics. At Metacritic, which assigns a normalized rating out of 100 to reviews from mainstream publications, the album received an average score of 80 based on four reviews.

AllMusic's James Christopher Monger stated that the album "needs a little time to get into your bloodstream before it can be reckoned with, but ultimately, it's an infection worth sweating through". John Gentile of Punknews.org wrote: "there is a great deal of fun being had by all parties here. But, unlike, perhaps other works that reference classic styles, this is no send up or wry reference, but a sheer appreciation for the work of the weirdo masters of yesteryear... as performed by the weirdo masters of today". Rachel Thompson of The Line of Best Fit resumed praising "Ipecac Recordings for allowing these two visionaries to continue to challenge the purpose and the manner of music".

== Track listing ==
No.	Title	Length
1.	"Red Rainbow"	3:51
2.	"Black Albino"	4:56
3.	"Peste Bubónica"	4:09
4.	"Papillion"	3:50
5.	"Dispossession"	4:08
6.	"A Burnt Out Case"	2:58
7.	"Imodium"	3:52
8.	"Fountain Gasoline"	4:54
Total length:		32:38

== Personnel ==
- John Erik Kaada – composer, orchestration
- Mike Patton – composer
- Stavanger Symphony Orchestra – orchestra
- Trond Husebø – conductor
- Børre Mølstad – additional tuba, additional trombone
- Yi Yang – additional violin
- Johannes Martens – additional cello
- Kenneth Ryland – additional double bass
- Eirik Olivier – orchestra executive producer
- Gaute Aadnesen – orchestra co-producer
- Glenn Paulsen – orchestra management
- Åsgeir Grong – recording
- Øyvind Grong – recording assistant
- Stein Holdhus – recording stage management
- Helen Farr – score coordinator
- Lars Brenli – music preparation
- Frank Arkwright – mastering
- Martin Kvamme – cover design
