= Steve Hubback =

Welsh percussionist and instrument maker

Background information
- Origin: Barry, Wales
- Genres: Free improvisation
- Occupations: Percussionist; instrument maker; sound sculptor
- Instruments: Percussion
- Years active: Late 1970s–present
- Website: stevehubback.nl

Steve Hubback is a Welsh percussionist, instrument maker and sound sculptor associated with free improvisation. His performances and recordings incorporate gongs, cymbals and other metal instruments that he makes.

== Career ==
Hubback began his musical career in the late 1970s. At a jazz school in Barry he was mentored by drummer Tony Oxley. In August 1982, at the Treforest festival in South Wales, Hubback performed with saxophonist Peter Brötzmann. A recording of the performance was released by FMR Records as Treforest 82 in 2026.

During the 1980s, Hubback toured and recorded as a jazz and rock percussionist. His first record contract was with the Berlin-based label Dossier Records. Dossier released his album Be Alright When I'm Dead in 1986. In May 2004, Brian Morton profiled Hubback in the British music magazine The Wire.

== Instrument making and sound sculpture ==
Hubback began making gongs and cymbals in Scandinavia in 1990. His subsequent work has included gong and cymbal sculptures, site-specific pieces and wearable metal instruments. Instruments made by Hubback have been used by percussionists including Paolo Vinaccia, Marilyn Mazur and Audun Kleive.

In 2001, Michael Bettine and Trevor Taylor included Hubback in their book Percussion Profiles, a collection devoted to 25 percussionists. In May 2002, he appeared on the Dutch music programme Vrije Geluiden, where he discussed making instruments and improvised with Bertus Fridael.

In 2007, MusicRadar reported on an exhibition in Eindhoven of Hubback's gongs and percussion sculptures made from an alloy supplied by the Swiss cymbal manufacturer Paiste.

From 14 to 21 November 2023, Hubback was an artist in residence at the Massachusetts College of Art and Design in Boston, where he exhibited and demonstrated instruments. During the residency he recorded the solo album The Last Free City, which was released by FMR Records in 2024 and mixed and mastered by Elliott Sharp. From 4 June to 4 July 2024, the ERRATUM gallery in Milan presented Metalkymist: Forged from Dreams, an exhibition of his sound sculptures curated by Sergio Armaroli and Steve Piccolo.

== Critical reception ==
Reviewing Cipher's album Elemental Forces (2006), John Kelman of All About Jazz wrote that Hubback's self-made percussion provided unconventional rhythmic foundations and textures. In a review of Hubback's 2010 duo album with saxophonist Ad Peijnenburg, Arrows, Stef Gijssels of The Free Jazz Collective contrasted Hubback's interest in the sound of bells, drums and gongs with Peijnenburg's more repetitive approach.

Reviewing Metal Moves' Metalkymist (2020) for The Squid's Ear, Jeph Jerman described an album centred on the sounds of Hubback's forged instruments and compared some of its passages to gamelan, the cimbalom and the work of Z'EV. In Salt Peanuts, Eyal Hareuveni characterised The Last Free City as alternating between resonant, rhythmic and more spacious sections, and discussed Hubback's use of a mobile aluminium sound sculpture.

== Selected discography ==
=== As leader or co-leader ===
- 1986: Be Alright When I'm Dead (Dossier Records)
- 2000: Demystify, with Frode Gjerstad (FMR Records)
- 2010: Arrows, with Ad Peijnenburg (FMR Records)
- 2020: Metalkymist, as Metal Moves (FMR Records)
- 2024: The Last Free City (FMR Records)
- 2025: As We Move Forward (Ictus Records)
- 2026: Treforest 82, with Peter Brötzmann (FMR Records; recorded in 1982)

=== As a contributing musician ===
- 2006: Cipher, Elemental Forces (Burning Shed)
- 2024: Andrea Centazzo, Ictus@45 – Out Off Nights (Fundacja Słuchaj; recorded in 2022)

== Publication ==
- Hubback, Steve (2004). Fire and Steel: Sound Sculptures, Mobiles, Symbols and Atmospherics. Chelmsford: Soundworld. ISBN 978-1-902440-07-1.
