= Space Cowboy (film) =

2024 documentary film

- Theatrical release poster
- Directed by: Bryce Leavitt; Marah Strauch
- Produced by: Richard Valenzuela; Bryce Leavitt; Tyler Measom; Marah Strauch
- Starring: Joe Jennings
- Cinematography: Tony Johansson
- Edited by: Eric Bruggemann; J. Davis
- Music by: Brooke Blair; Will Blair
- Release date: September 6, 2024 (TIFF)
- Running time: 98 minutes
- Country: United States
- Language: English

Space Cowboy is a 2024 American documentary film which explores the career of Joe Jennings, a pioneer of skydiving cinematography. It is directed and produced by Bryce Leavitt and Marah Strauch. It premiered at the 2024 Toronto International Film Festival.

== Reception ==
On the review aggregator website Rotten Tomatoes, 100% of 11 critics' reviews are positive.

Alison Foreman of IndieWire gave the film an A− and wrote, "A documentary that will make you laugh, cry, and maybe even want to jump out of a plane, Strauch and Leavitt's work is a must-see (even if it isn't exactly breaking the mold on the documentary format) and this story is one you should know. Kind, caring, and plummeting to Earth like the rest of us, Joe Jennings is the hero that will remind you to save yourself."
