= Sunshine Superman (film) =

- Film poster
- Directed by: Marah Strauch
- Written by: Marah Strauch
- Produced by: Eric Bruggemann; Marah Strauch
- Cinematography: Carl Boenish; Vasco Nunes; Nico Poulsson; Peter Degerfeldt
- Edited by: Kevin McGuinness; Marah Strauch
- Music by: KAADA
- Production companies: CNN Films; Scissor Kick Films; Flimmer Films
- Distributed by: Magnolia Pictures (United States); Universal Pictures (International)
- Release dates: September 4, 2014 (Toronto); May 22, 2015 (US)
- Running time: 101 minutes
- Countries: United States; Norway
- Language: English

Sunshine Superman is a 2014 documentary film that depicts the life and death of Carl Boenish, an American freefall cinematographer considered the "father of BASE jumping". The film was produced and directed by Marah Strauch and produced by Eric Bruggemann. It is a co-production of Scissor Kick Films (US) and Flimmer Films, and co-producer Lars Løge (Norway). It premiered as an Opening Night film at the Toronto International Film Festival on September 4, 2014. It was released in North America by Magnolia Pictures on May 22, 2015, and later internationally by Universal Pictures. It had its North American broadcast premiere on CNN on January 17, 2016.

== Synopsis ==
Sunshine Superman follows Carl Boenish's career as a freefall cinematographer and BASE jumper, beginning with his early work as a skydiver in the 1960s until his final jump off the Troll Wall in the mountains of Norway in 1984. Director Marah Strauch uses a combination of aerial footage shot by Boenish himself on his 16mm camera, archival footage from films and television shows, modern reenactments, and interviews with friends, family, and other BASE jumping colleagues. Footage from Boenish's 1978 jump off of El Capitan in Yosemite National Park and his successful Guinness World Record-setting double jump (with wife, Jean Boenish) off the Troll Wall in Norway are included in the film. Sunshine Superman also explores the relationship between Carl and his wife Jean through archival footage and interviews with Jean herself.

== Production ==
Contemporary portions of Sunshine Superman were filmed on location in the United States and Norway and featured interviews with friends, family, and BASE jumping colleagues of Carl Boenish. Director Marah Strauch also compiled footage from Boenish's archive which consisted of spools of 16mm aerial cinematography that amounted to 70,000 feet in length. Peter Degerfeldt provided aerial cinematography for all contemporary reenactments.

Original music was provided by Norwegian composer, KAADA. The soundtrack also included songs from the 1960s and 70's including tracks from Thunderclap Newman, The Hollies, The Sweet, and others. Producers Marah Strauch and Eric Bruggemann also served as music supervisors. The film was produced by Scissor Kick Films (US) in co-production with Flimmer Films and Lars Løge (Norway). Alex Gibney, Josh Braun, and Dan Braun served as executive producers.

== Release ==
Prior to the film's premiere at the Toronto International Film Festival (TIFF), its international distribution rights were acquired by Universal Pictures. Sunshine Superman officially debuted as an Opening Night selection at TIFF on September 4, 2014. Soon after, the film's North American theatrical distribution rights were acquired by Magnolia Pictures and its North American television broadcast rights were acquired by CNN Films. The film was released theatrically in North America on May 22, 2015, and later that summer internationally. It had its North American broadcast television debut on January 17, 2016, on CNN.

== Reception ==
Sunshine Superman received substantial critical acclaim upon its release. On review aggregator Rotten Tomatoes the film has an approval rating of 92% based on 59 reviews, with an average rating of 7.2/10. The site's critical consensus reads "Sunshine Superman shines a light on a fascinating life with copious amounts of incredible, thrilling footage." On Metacritic, which assigns a rating to reviews, the film has a weighted average score of 70 out of 100, based on 20 critics, indicating "generally favorable reviews".

John Anderson of IndieWire gave the film an "A" rating, describing it as "part thrill ride and part love story" and noting that "Strauch creates enormous drama from the clips at her disposal – not just the Boenish material, but movie clips and found footage, all of which is deftly handled." Writing for The Washington Post, Stephanie Merry noted that the film "might seem like a niche story, with its focus on stunts that most people wouldn't dream of actually doing, but the documentary feels universal. It's simply an examination of how one man fully embraced life while charting his own path." Dom Sinacola of Paste praised director Marah Strauch, saying she "spent years crafting something of a perfect eulogy to Carl Boenish — and her dedication to investigating his outsized life is palpable."

=== Accolades ===
Sunshine Superman was an Opening Night selection at the Toronto International Film Festival where it premiered. It was also a Closing Night film at both the Atlanta Film Festival and the Full Frame Documentary Film Festival. Other accolades include:

Award	Category	Recipients and nominees	Outcome
Portland International Film Festival	Best Documentary Feature	Sunshine Superman	Won
Portland International Film Festival	Best New Director	Marah Strauch	Won
