= Gringo (album) =

2009 album by Circus Devils

Studio album by Circus Devils
- Released: 2009
- Recorded: 2008 / 2009 at Waterloo Sound Recording in Kent, Ohio
- Genre: Indie rock, alternative rock, psychedelic rock
- Label: Happy Jack Rock Records
- Producer: Todd Tobias

Circus Devils chronology
| Ataxia (2008) | Gringo (2009) | Mother skinny (2010) |

Professional ratings
Review scores
| Source | Rating |
|---|---|
| Under the Radar | 7/10 stars |
| Allmusic | 4.0/5 stars |
| The Fire Note | 4.0/5 stars |
| Erasing Clouds | 4/5 stars |
| Citizen Dick | 4/5 stars |
| Luna Kafé | 3.5/5 stars |
| The Agit Reader | 3.5/5 stars |
| Salt Lake City Weekly | 4.0/5 stars |

Gringo is the seventh studio album released by the American psychedelic rock band Circus Devils in 2009. All songs on Gringo were written and performed by Robert Pollard, Todd Tobias, and Tim Tobias. The first all-acoustic album released by Circus Devils, Gringo is a song cycle in which each track recounts a moment in the life of a nameless drifter known only as "the Gringo." The moods on the album range widely between jubilant to melancholy to mean.

== Reaction ==
Dave Heaton, writing for Erasing Clouds, noted,

Musically the album is filled with creepy film-score interludes and art-rock grinders, but also pretty and strange acoustic balladry. Like every Circus Devils album, it feels haunted, but those ghosts do less screaming and more gentle creeping and following. And of course, nothing is as it seems. There's a lot to savor and decipher throughout. With Gringo, you can get lulled into comfort, but then you'll be stabbed in the face.

The Fire Note's Christopher Anthony wrote,

The latest from Circus Devils once again proves that this vehicle has no rules, boundaries or expectations. This seventh release tells the story of Gringo in a simple, mostly acoustic form that still embraces the Circus Devils love for eclectic background noises but is their most straightforward set of accessible songs to date. You can call Gringo a statement, a step forward, a step backwards, or just the right step but the Circus Devils finalize the notion that trying to put a label on them remains impossible and that is what makes them worth seeking out!

== Track listing ==
1. Witness Hill
2. Every Moment Flame On
3. Ships From Prison to Prison
4. Bad Baby Blue
5. Easy Baby
6. Before it Walks
7. Monkey Head
8. The Beast Falls Down
9. Letters From a Witch
10. Arizona Blacktop Company
11. Hot Water Wine
12. In Your Hour of Rescue
13. Ants
14. Stars On All Night
15. The Gasoline Drinkers
16. Yellow Cloud (inst.)
