= 1001 Grams =

2014 Norwegian film by Bent Hamer

- Film poster
- Directed by: Bent Hamer
- Written by: Bent Hamer
- Starring: Ane Dahl Torp; Laurent Stocker; Hildegun Riise
- Music by: John Erik Kaada
- Release dates: 7 September 2014 (TIFF); 26 September 2014 (Norway)
- Running time: 93 minutes
- Country: Norway
- Languages: Norwegian; French; English

1001 Grams (Norwegian: 1001 Gram) is a 2014 Norwegian drama film written and directed by Bent Hamer. It was selected as the Norwegian entry for the Best Foreign Language Film at the 87th Academy Awards, but was not nominated.

== Cast ==
- Ane Dahl Torp as Marie, a scientist
- Laurent Stocker as Pi
- Hildegun Riise as Wenche
- Peter Hudson as Professor Winkler
- Didier Flamand as Gérard
- Emil Abossolo-Mbo as Observer
- Sabine Pakora as Observer
- Per Christian Ellefsen
- Magne-Håvard Brekke
- Stein Winge

== See also ==
- List of submissions to the 87th Academy Awards for Best Foreign Language Film
- List of Norwegian submissions for the Academy Award for Best Foreign Language Film
