= Ringworm Interiors =

2001 album by Circus Devils

Studio album by Circus Devils
- Released: October 31, 2001
- Genre: Experimental rock, alternative rock, psychedelic rock
- Label: Rockathon Records / Fading Captain Series
- Producer: Todd Tobias

Circus Devils chronology
Ringworm Interiors (2001)	The Harold Pig Memorial (2002)

Ringworm Interiors is the debut album from the Ohio psychedelic rock trio Circus Devils. Released in 2001, the album is a collage of brash musical vignettes with moods ranging from aggressive and disorienting to haunting and dreamy.

Members of Circus Devils include Robert Pollard, founder of the band Guided by Voices, along with producer/musician Todd Tobias and guitarist Tim Tobias.

== Reception ==
Professional ratings
Review scores
Source	Rating
Allmusic	4.5/5 stars
Alternative Press	4/5 stars
Erasing Clouds	4.0/5 stars

AllMusic's Bart Bealmear wrote,

A psychedelic boat rides that leads to a poorly lit and wicked place, where even the nursery rhymes of youth become foreboding. Beauty dances with ugliness, much like it does in the work of Roman Polanski and David Lynch, filmmakers who are drawn to the amalgam of good and evil that permeates the real world. Furthering the connection, many of (Todd) Tobias' instrumental beads could be effectively re-scored to works like Twin Peaks and Rosemary's Baby.

On behalf of Erasing Clouds, Dave Heaton said the album is

likely to appeal to music fans interested in extreme rock, or in music which is rooted in rock but which pushes the usual boundaries. This is a psychedelic mindtrip with heavy metal textures melding with non-sequitur lyrics delivered by many means of vocalizing (few of which would be described as "good singing"), and everything's cloaked in more feedback and fuzz than you can imagine. While some of the more direct songs demonstrate that hard rock is at this music's core, this is rock music that's been transformed into something dark and strange. With Ringworm Interiors, my first reaction was to yell "What the hell is this?" and quickly throw it aside. Those who give up too soon, however, miss being taken deep into a unique musical world. It's not a world likely to appeal to mass audiences, but it is an unmistakably distinct one that you won't soon forget.

== Track listing ==
1. "Devilspeak"
2. "Feel Try Fury"
3. "Buffalo Spiders"
4. "North Morning Silver Trip"
5. "Ringworm Interiors"
6. "Spectacle"
7. "You First"
8. "Knifesong"
9. "Kingdom of teeth"
10. "Oil Birds"
11. "Lizard Food"
12. "Not So Fast"
13. "Apparent the Red Angus"
14. "Playhouse Hostage"
15. "Straps Hold Up the Jaw"
16. "Correcto"
17. "Star Peppered Wheat Germ"
18. "Silver Eyeballs"
19. "Decathalon" [sic]
20. "Peace needle"
21. "Drill Sgt. Soul"
22. "Protect Thy Interests"
23. "Let's Go Back to Bed"
24. "Sterility Megaplant"
25. "New You"
26. "Circus Devils Theme"
