= Pinball Mars =

2003 album by Circus Devils

Studio album by Circus Devils
- Released: 2003
- Genre: Experimental rock, alternative rock, psychedelic rock
- Label: Rockathon Records / Fading Captain Series
- Producer: Todd Tobias

Circus Devils chronology
The Harold Pig Memorial (2002)	Pinball Mars (2003)	Five (2005)

Professional ratings
Review scores
Source	Rating
AllMusic	4.5/5 stars
Erasing Clouds	3/5 stars

Pinball Mars is the third studio album from Ohio alternative rock band Circus Devils. The album, written as a mini-rock opera, was released in 2004. All songs were written and performed by Robert Pollard, Todd Tobias and Tim Tobias.

== Reception ==
On behalf of Erasing Clouds, David Heaton wrote,

Somewhere between the caustic noise of 2001's Ringworm Interiors and the more reined-in, sensitive concept album The Harold Pig Memorial (2002), Pinball Mars often sounds like arena rock anthems after they've been processed by two different mechanisms: one looking to make them into death-metal hymns to Satan, the other trying to discover what would happen if classic rock and free jazz had a baby.

AllMusic's Bart Bealmear added,

The soundtrack is one of blood-curdling fancy merry-go-round rides. One wants off, but can't because of what awaits. It's as if an illicit IV has been administered during REM sleep, drawing the listener closer to the protagonists, and further into their shady world. The theme of good and evil has always been the Circus Devils' focus, but here the concept feels different, more human.

== Track listing ==
1. "Are You Out With Me"
2. "Gargoyle City"
3. "Pinball Mars"
4. "Sick Color"
5. "Don't Be Late"
6. "Inkster and King"
7. "A Puritan for Storage"
8. "Alien"
9. "Plasma"
10. "Dragging the Medicine"
11. "Bow Before Your Champion"
12. "Glass Boots"
13. "(No) Hell for Humor"
14. "Raw Reaction"
