= The Harold Pig Memorial =

2002 album by Circus Devils

Studio album by Circus Devils
- Released: 2002
- Genre: Alternative rock, psychedelic rock
- Label: Rockathon Records /the Fading Captain Series
- Producer: Todd Tobias

Circus Devils chronology
Ringworm Interiors (2001)	The Harold Pig Memorial (2002)	Pinball Mars (2003)

Professional ratings
Review scores
Source	Rating
Allmusic	4.5/5 stars
Popmatters	3/5 stars
The Broken Face	4.5/5 stars

The Harold Pig Memorial is the second studio album by the American psychedelic rock trio Circus Devils, released in 2002. Conceived as a concept album, each song depicts an episode in the life of biker Harold Pig as told by Harold's friends at his wake.

== Reception ==
Erasing Clouds's Dave Heaton wrote,

The album has an epic sweep to it which makes it feel like a journey. While the nonsequitors and genuinely creepy stretches make Circus Devils' music likely too odd for your average music fan, this isn't a hapless "side project" but an intricate, intoxicating epic showcasing a unique, hybrid form of rock.

On behalf of AllMusic, Karen E. Graves added,

Pollard's patented vocal hooks are sprinkled throughout and vicious guitar solos add to the Devils' sweeping sense of barely controlled chaos. The tone of the album remains dark and is again done on a grand soundtrack scale, but whereas Ringworm Interiors had a menacing, unsettling, perhaps David Lynchian feel, The Harold Pig Memorial has a more unifying, often suitably funereal (but still unsettling), musical theme woven throughout.

== Track listing ==
1. Alaska to Burning Men
2. Saved Herself, Shaved Herself
3. Soldiers of June
4. I Guess I Needed That
5. Festival of Death
6. Dirty World News
7. May We See the Hostage
8. Do You Feel Legal?
9. A Birdcage Until Further Notice
10. Injured?
11. Foxhead Delivery
12. Last Punk Standing
13. Bull Spears
14. Discussions in the Cave
15. Recirculating Hearse
16. Pigs Can't Hide (On Their Day Off)
17. Exoskeleton Motorcade
18. Real Trip No.3
19. Vegas
20. The Pilot's Crucifixion / Indian Oil
21. Tulip Review
22. The Harold Pig Memorial
