= Kaada/Patton Live =

2007 video by Kaada/Patton

Live

Video by Kaada/Patton
- Released: November 20, 2007
- Recorded: 2005
- Genre: Avant-garde
- Length: 52:06
- Label: Ipecac Recordings (IPC96) (DVD)
- Director: Marianne Bakke; Daniel Voldheim
- Producer: Kaada/Patton

Kaada/Patton chronology
Romances (2004)	Live (2007)	Bacteria Cult (2016)

Professional ratings
Review scores
Source	Rating
AllMusic	4/5 stars
Impose magazine	Neutral
Scene Point Blank	9/10 stars
Subba-Cultcha	8/10 stars
Type3 media	8.5/10 stars

Kaada/Patton Live is a DVD of the collaboration between Mike Patton and John Kaada that was released on November 20, 2007. The DVD features a live performance of the music from the album Romances from Roskilde Festival 2005. The video is in black & white.

== Track listing ==
1. "Legless Liss"
2. "Invocation"
3. "Pitié Pour Mes Larmes"
4. "Aubade"
5. "L'Absent"
6. "Crépuscule"
7. "Viens, Les Gazons Sont Verts"
8. "Seule"
9. "Pensée Des Morts"
10. "Nuit Silencieuse"
11. "The Cloroform Theme"

== Extras ==
- Rehearsal film
- Photo gallery

== Personnel ==
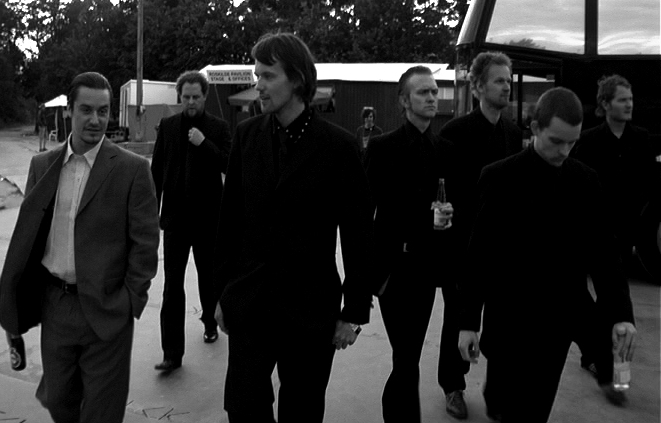
Kaada Patton with band

- Erland Dahlen - percussion, xylophone, vocals
- Børge Fjordheim - drums, vocals
- Hallvard Wennersberg Hagen - electronics
- John Erik Kaada - keyboards, vocals, producer
- Mike Patton - electronics, percussion, vocals
- Øyvind Storesund - bass, whistling
- Geir Sundstøl - guitar, lapsteel guitar, vocals
- Martin Kvamme - cover design
