= Thank You for Giving Me Your Valuable Time =

Studio album by Kaada
- Released: 2001 (EMI); 25 February 2003 (Ipecac Recordings)
- Genres: Instrumental pop, alternative rock, experimental
- Length: 43:43
- Labels: EMI (2001) (0724353608859); Ipecac Recordings (2003) (IPC-037)
- Producer: Kaada

Kaada chronology
Thank You for Giving Me Your Valuable Time (2001)	MECD (2004)

Music video
- "No You Don't" on YouTube

Professional ratings
Review scores
Source	Rating
Allmusic	link
Dagbladet	link
NRK	link

Thank You for Giving Me Your Valuable Time is the debut album by Norwegian pop/experimental/Avant-garde Kaada. Initially released by EMI in 2001, it would be re-released in 2003 by Ipecac Recordings, with the track "Volkswagen" being removed.

== Track listing ==
All tracks are written by Kaada.

No.	Title	Length
1.	"Care"	3:42
2.	"Mainframe"	4:04
3.	"Black California"	4:50
4.	"Burden"	3:52
5.	"No You Don't"	4:14
6.	"Go Brown"	4:11
7.	"Volkswagen" (absent in the 2003 Ipecac Recordings re-release)	4:40
8.	"All Wrong"	3:01
9.	"Honk"	3:46
10.	"I Need You"	3:16
11.	"Thank You for Giving Me Your Valuable Time"	4:12
Total length:		43:43

== Personnel ==
Album artwork by Martin Kvamme.

== Note ==
- "Care" and "Thank You for Giving Me Your Valuable Time" are in the soundtrack of the 2001 Norwegian film Mongoland.
- "Burden" is present in the soundtrack of the 2003 Swedish film Tur och retur (Swedish for "Round Trip").
- "Black California" was featured in American advertisements for the 2014 Toyota Tundra.
