= Mother Skinny =

2010 album by Circus Devils

Studio album by Circus Devils
- Released: 2010
- Recorded: 2009 / 2010 at Waterloo Sound Recording in Brecksville, Ohio
- Genre: Alternative rock, psychedelic rock, art rock
- Label: Happy Jack Rock Records
- Producer: Todd Tobias

Circus Devils chronology
Gringo (2009)	Mother Skinny (2010)	Capsized! (2011)

Professional ratings
Review scores
Source	Rating
The Fire Note	3.5/5 stars
Popmatters	6/10 stars
Erasing Clouds	4/5 stars

Mother Skinny is the eighth studio album released by the American psychedelic rock band Circus Devils in March, 2010. All songs on Mother Skinny were written and performed by Robert Pollard, Todd Tobias, and Tim Tobias. The album is a return to the aggressive rock sound of the band's earlier albums, following the mostly acoustic 2009 album Gringo.

== Reaction ==
The Fire Note wrote,

Mother Skinny is just plain sinister art rock, that will keep your ear to your speaker so that you don't miss a beat. Robert Pollard has never sounded more scary with his evil cackle on "Germ Circus" or his stretched out slow delivery in "Lurking", which feels like he is literally and weirdly right behind you. The record is more of a return to their earlier work but adds in very strong thumping beats and guitar riffs, that absolutely drive each of the twenty tracks down your throat. Once again, Mother Skinny is a record that separates itself from the Circus Devil's vast catalog and will be a fun ride for anybody who dares to put it in their player!

Matthew Fiander, writing for PopMatters, added,

These kooky songs pack an awkward punch, and make some room for us, the listeners, to immerse ourselves in sounds that are more accessible without being any less weird. If “icky-sticky” kook-pop and trudging, druggy rock are the two poles of the record, then the Circus Devils travel the huge space between them pretty well.

On behalf of Erasing Clouds, Dave Heaton wrote,

Mother Skinny is immediate, moody, nightmarish, morbid, and darkly humorous. Paranoia is the keyword this time. Everywhere people are trying to get you, to put you in a freezer or a cave. There’s an insect lurking, a germ circus “always around” and “eating up the kids”. The ominous “We Don’t Need to Know Who You Are” suggests a secret society. The music is epic as always, and fierce, with thick heavy metal riffs. If it’s a metal album it’s also a circus album, like Tom Waits and Black Sabbath meeting in a cavern. Sometimes it seems like Circus Devils are rewriting hard-rock history as being all about giant spiders (“8 Legs to Love”)…but wait, isn’t that what it was always about? Mother Skinny is a sick, fun romp, an excuse to indulge in the scariest and weirdest of imagery.

== Track listing ==
1. "Sub Rat"
2. "Lurking"
3. "Wolf Man Chords"
4. "Hard Art (Hard All Day)"
5. "Get On It"
6. "His Troops are Loyal"
7. "Kingdoms of Korea"
8. "Bam Bam bam"
9. "The Germ Circus"
10. "8 Legs to Love You"
11. "17 Days on the Pole"
12. "Freezer Burn"
13. "We Don't Need to Know Who You Are"
14. "A Living Necklace of Warts"
15. "The New Nostalgia"
16. "The Cave of Disappearing Men"
17. "Mother Skinny"
18. "All the Good Ones Are Gone"
19. "Pledge"
20. "Shut Up"
