= Crime and Dissonance =

Compilation album by Ennio Morricone
- Released: October 18, 2005
- Genre: Film music
- Length: 1:41:52
- Label: Ipecac
- Producers: Alan Bishop, Mike Patton, Greg Werckman

Ennio Morricone chronology
Maestro (2005)	Crime and Dissonance (2005)	Itinerary of a Genius (2005)

Crime and Dissonance is a 2005 compilation album of Italian composer Ennio Morricone's film score work. Intended as a follow-up to two earlier Morricone compilations assembled by Dagored, the album was put together by Alan Bishop and released by Ipecac Recordings. Crime and Dissonance features work ranging from the later 1960s to the early 1980s, and contains scores taken from films of several different genres.

The collection focuses on Morricone's lesser-known soundtrack work, with Ipecac founder Mike Patton consciously wishing to distance it from similar compilations. Released on October 18, 2005, Crime and Dissonance has been met with favorable reviews by critics. The album has attracted comments on Morricone's experimental and innovative compositional style, often in contrast to the spare-sounding westerns he is known for.

== Production ==
Crime and Dissonance, a collection of Ennio Morricone's film scores from the 1970s, was conceived as a follow-up to Dagored releases Morricone 2000 and Morricone 2001. However, that label abandoned the project, and Mike Patton of Ipecac Recordings decided to release it instead. Morricone had no input in the project; instead the track listing was assembled by Alan Bishop. Bishop had previously assembled the Morricone 2000 and Morricone 2001 collections as well. All three compilations cover a roughly coterminous time period, spanning the late 1960s to the early 1980s, but concentrating primarily on the early 1970s. Bishop had been given a list of films whose scores were available to use in the collection; he set about compiling the two-disc set from there. However, the final song on the album, an eleven-minute section from the soundtrack to Un uomo da rispettare, was not included in the list of available material. The project was delayed for some time while Bishop waited for record label Sugar Music to license the song.

Patton, founder of Ipecac Recordings, has described his admiration for Morricone's writing, feeling that the composer turned "what could be banal, surface-style pop into really deep, orchestrated, tense and compelling music". Patton considers Morricone to be one of his favorite composers, and wanted the compilation to serve as a fitting tribute. He felt it was "imperative" for Crime and Dissonance to focus on Morricone's lesser-known work, as it had to compete with a large back catalogue of similar compilations. To this end, Patton and Bishop focused on Morricone's more experimental work, which Patton has compared to the music of Brazilian tropicália group Os Mutantes. Patton has praised Bishop's work on the project, calling him "a big Morricone scholar", and has described Crime and Dissonance as one of the Ipecac releases he is most proud of.

Crime and Dissonance features liner notes written by composer John Zorn, who had previously reinterpreted Morricone's work on the album The Big Gundown. The album's title reflects the range of genres covered by the films whose scores have been included, with the collection gathering music from "horror, suspense, mafia, and period movies", including several pieces taken from Dario Argento's giallo film L'uccello dalle piume di cristallo. However, the album itself only lists the titles of the films, omitting the context in which the music was originally presented and leaving the compositions to "speak for themselves".

== Track listing ==
All tracks are written by Ennio Morricone, except for "Memento" by Morricone and Walter Bianchi and "Il Buio" by Morricone and Bruno Nicolai.

Disc One
No.	Title	Film	Length
1.	"Giorno Di Notte"	Una lucertola con la pelle di donna	4:43
2.	"Astratto 3"	Veruschka, poesia di una donna	1:48
3.	"Corsa Sui Tetti"	L' Uccello dalle piume di cristallo	5:00
4.	"Ric Happening"	Metti una sera a cena	3:23
5.	"Memento"	L'Istruttoria è chiusa: dimentichi	2:38
6.	"Recreazione Divertita"	Cuore di mamma	2:59
7.	"Studio De Colore"	L'assoluto naturale	1:13
8.	"Forza G (Quella Donna)"	Forza G	2:32
9.	"Placcaggio"	Il gatto a nove code	2:33
10.	"Seguita"	Gli occhi freddi della paura	3:15
11.	"Postludio Alla Terza Moglie"	Barbablu'	2:43
12.	"L'Uccello Con Le Piume Di Cristallo (Titoli)"	L' Uccello dalle piume di cristallo	1:25
13.	"Il Buio"	L'anticristo	4:00
14.	"Rapimento In Campo Aperto"	La moglie più bella	1:24
15.	"Le Fotografie"	Veruschka, poesia di una donna	1:01
16.	"Spiriti"	Una lucertola con la pelle di donna	2:12
17.	"Ninna Nanna Per Adulteri"	Cuore di mamma	1:01
18.	"Astrazione Con Ritmo"	Il serpente	4:19
Total length:			51:37

Disc Two
No.	Title	Film	Length
1.	"Trafelato"	Giornata nera per l'ariete	2:30
2.	"Sensi"	Un bellissimo novembre	2:45
3.	"Gli Intoccabili (Titoli)"	Gli intoccabili	1:39
4.	"Fondate Paure"	Una lucertola con la pelle di donna	2:45
5.	"L'Attentato (alternate version 1)"	L'Attentato	2:38
6.	"Fumeria D'Oppio"	La dame aux camélias	5:54
7.	"1970"	Il gatto a nove code	8:39
8.	"Esplicitamente Sospeso"	Il serpente	4:42
9.	"Sequenza 10"	Sesso in confessionale	2:51
10.	"Paura E Aggressione (short version)"	Giornata nera per l'ariete	1:54
11.	"Folle Folle"	Gli occhi freddi della paura	3:42
12.	"Un Uomo Da Rispettare (Titoli)"	Un uomo da rispettare	11:39
Total length:			50:15

== Reception ==
Professional ratings
Review scores
Source	Rating
Allrovi	4.5/5 stars
The A.V. Club	A−
Pitchfork Media	(8.0/10)
Stylus Magazine	A−
Tiny Mix Tapes	3.5/5 stars

Crime and Dissonance was released on October 18, 2005, through the Ipecac Recordings label, although it has previously been scheduled for release on September 6 of the same year.

The album has garnered mostly positive reviews from critics. Writing for Allrovi, Thom Jurek rated the collection four-and-a-half stars out of five, calling it "essential Morricone". Jurek felt that the album served to present "a much wider view of Morricone not only as a composer, but as a sonic experimentalist". Pitchfork Media's Joe Tangari awarded the album a score of eight out of ten, describing it as "a minor revelation". Tangari felt that the collection represented Morricone's most innovative period of work, and praised Bishop's compilation for its cohesion and flow. Joshua Klein of The Washington Post has described the album as featuring "bizarre soundscapes, discordant drones, proto-sampledelica, weird instruments, strange sounds and oddball voices". Klein felt that the collection portrayed Morricone as a ground-breaking and confident composer, eschewing his trademark spare-sounding scores to freely experiment.

The A.V. Club's Andy Battaglia rated the compilation an A−, noting its dissimilarity to Morricone's more well-known work. Battaglia complimented the arrangement of the tracks, feeling that they flowed into one another well, and noted the range of genres the collection represented. Danny Fasold of The Roanoke Times has commented on the wide variety of styles the collection contains, adding that it proves "Morricone always delivered something interesting". Stylus Magazine's Cameron Macdonald rated the album an A−, finding that the "kitsch" mass-market appeal of Morricone's better-known western scores made Crime and Dissonance a more "relevant" record. However, Macdonald felt that album's second disc was the weaker of the two, finding that the "slapstick" nature of some of its pieces seemed out of place. Dave Gurney of Tiny Mix Tapes rated Crime and Dissonance three-and-a-half out of five, calling it "a group of Morricone's most uncompromising works". However, Gurney questioned the target audience of the collection, believing that it would not be likely to appeal to casual listeners while not presenting much new material for dedicated Morricone collectors. An anonymous review for The Stranger described the album as proof that "there's much more to the maestro than his revered spaghetti-western work for Sergio Leone". The review highlighted the range of genres present in the collection, calling the result a "deluge of otherworldly, endlessly fascinating sounds".

== See also ==
- Ipecac Recordings discography
