= Kitchen Stories =

2003 Norwegian film

- The film's cover shows Folke observing from an umpire's chair
- Directed by: Bent Hamer
- Written by: Jörgen Bergmark; Bent Hamer
- Produced by: Jörgen Bergmark; Bent Hamer
- Music by: Hans Mathisen
- Release date: 17 January 2003
- Running time: 95 minutes
- Countries: Norway; Sweden
- Language: Norwegian

Kitchen Stories (Norwegian: Salmer fra Kjøkkenet) is a 2003 Norwegian film by Bent Hamer, director of Eggs and O' Horten. The film was Norway’s entry for the 2003 Academy Awards and was a selection at the Cannes and Toronto Film Festivals.

== Plot ==
Swedish efficiency researchers come to Norway to study Norwegian men, in an effort to help optimize their use of their kitchens. Folke Nilsson (Tomas Norström) is assigned to study the habits of Isak Bjørvik (Joachim Calmeyer). By the rules of the research institute, Folke has to sit on an umpire's chair in Isak's kitchen and observe him from there, but never talk to him. Isak volunteered for the program with the promise of a horse, but he only receives a dala horse, a little painted wooden statue.

Isak stops using his kitchen and observes Folke through a hole in the ceiling instead. The two lonely men, observer and observed, slowly overcome the initial Norwegian-Swede and subject-observer distrust and become friends. Isak's friend Grant visits him often. Grant is a concentration camp survivor and feels Folke is stealing his friend.

The friendship between Folke and Isak costs Folke his job during an inspection. He is forced to leave and drive up to the Swedish border, but then he returns, only to find Isak has died of a broken heart. Folke, now alone, occupies Isak's home and takes up Isak's friendship with Grant.

== Inspiration for the film ==
Bent Hamer was amused after perusing post-World War II research books on the efficiency of the Swedish housewife, and pondered on the idea of research being done on men. This led him to make the film Kitchen Stories with Swedish researchers and a Norwegian man as the main character.

== Cast ==
- Joachim Calmeyer as Isak Bjørvik, the man in the kitchen
- Tomas Norström as Folke Nilsson, the Swedish researcher
- Bjørn Floberg as Grant, the friend of Isak
- Reine Brynolfsson as Malmberg
- Sverre Anker Ousdal as Dr. Jack Zac. Benjaminsen, local G.P.
- Leif Andrée as Dr. Ljungberg, Swedish researcher
- Gard B. Eidsvold ground crew
- Lennart Jähkel as Green, Swedish researcher
- Trond Brænne as spokesman
- Bjørn Jenseg as caretaker
- Jan Gunnar Røise as assistant caretaker
- Karin Lunden as female corporate assistant

== Reception ==
On review aggregator website Rotten Tomatoes, the film holds an approval rating of 90% based on 72 reviews, with an average rating of 7.3/10.

== Awards ==
- Best Film, Amanda Award, Norway 2003
- Best Director, Copenhagen International Film Festival 2003
- Best Director, São Paulo International Film Festival 2003
- FIPRESCI Prize, Tromsø International Film Festival 2003
