= Five (Circus Devils album) =

2005 album by Circus Devils

Studio album by Circus Devils
- Released: October 31, 2005
- Recorded: 2005 at Waterloo Sound Recording
- Genre: Experimental rock, psychedelic rock, art rock
- Label: Rockathon Records / Fading Captain Series
- Producer: Todd Tobias

Circus Devils chronology
Pinball Mars (2004)	Five (2005)	Sgt. Disco (2007)

Professional ratings
Review scores
Source	Rating
AllMusic	3.0/5 stars
Coke Machine Glow	3/5 stars

Five is the fourth studio album by the experimental/psychedelic rock band Circus Devils. Released in 2005, Five is considered among the band's least accessible albums due to the fragmented moods and styles and the experimental nature of the music. All songs on Five were written and performed by Robert Pollard and Todd Tobias.

== Reception ==
The Detroit Free Press wrote, "Multi-instrumentalist (Todd) Tobias keeps things primal-n-futuristic while (Robert) Pollard's lyrics allude to the horrors of the human race in a way both cryptic and imaginative. Much like Gang of Four's attempt to wise us to the consumer world, Circus Devils forewarn of a world consuming us."

Bryan Roswell, writing for Coke Machine Glow, noted,

The previous (Circus Devils) albums were experimental, yet they somehow always kept at least one toe on the terra-firma of accessibility on which (Robert) Pollard has made a career. As such, these albums were wondrous romps through the slightly musically-disparate musical imaginations of its members. FIVE has Pollard and Todd Tobias amputating said toe, and the majority of the record is an over-indulgence of their prog-rock influences. They opt for experiment over melody and noise over rhythm.

Music Underwater's David Tandy wrote,

Five often doesn't feature a single guitar, instead relying on Todd Tobias's trademark aural textures to create moods often bordering on ambient, a new and exciting background for (Robert) Pollard to ply his trade. The new contrast is captivating from the start. FIVE is an album of wonderful aural scope and intelligence, filled with emotion. Whenever Pollard attempts a style of music with which he's unfamiliar, the results are always at worst interesting; here they're nothing short of spectacular.

== Track listing ==
1. "The Bending Sea"
2. "Look Between What's Goin' On"
3. "Just Touch Them"
4. "Artheroid Vogue"
5. "Dog Licking baby"
6. "Thelonius Has Eaten all the Paper"
7. "Strain"
8. "Animal Motel"
9. "Future For Germs"
10. "Effective News"
11. "No Wonder They Don't Stand Tall"
12. "We Taught Them Rock and Roll"
13. "Eyes Reload"
14. "Her Noise"
15. "In The Mood"
16. "Tell 'Em the Old Man is Coming Down"
17. "Dolphins of Color"
18. "Dreaming the Temple"
19. "The Word Business"
20. "Headhunter Who Blocks the Sky"
21. "People Thing"
22. "You Take the Lead"
23. "The Other Heart"
