= Hotellet =

Danish television series

- Genre: Drama
- Written by: Morten Arnfred; Peter Nyrén; Søren Sveistrup
- Directed by: Pia Bovin; Christian Dyekjær; Morten Giese
- Starring: Peter Schrøder; Kirsten Olesen; Martin Hestbæk; Anne-Grethe Bjarup Riis
- Country of origin: Denmark
- Original language: Danish
- No. of series: 5
- No. of episodes: 60

Production
- Production company: Jarowskij

Original release
- Network: TV 2

Hotellet (Danish original title: The Hotel) is a Danish television series that originally aired on Danish channel TV 2 between 2000–2002.

The series follows the Faber family and their life and work at the family hotel.

== Cast ==
- Peter Schrøder
- Kirsten Olesen
- Martin Hestbæk
- Anne-Grethe Bjarup Riis
- Trine Appel
- Paw Henriksen
- Bjarne Henriksen
- Søren Byder
- Sarah Boberg
- Lene Maria Christensen
- Jamile Massalkhi
- Baard Owe
