= Halloween Party (album) =

Studio album by Pink Anvil
- Released: April 22, 2003
- Recorded: October 31, 2001
- Genre: Experimental
- Label: Ipecac Recordings (CD) (IPC-039)

Pink Anvil chronology
Halloween Party	New Years Eve Party

Professional ratings
Review scores
Source	Rating
AllMusic	no score
Pitchfork Media	3.1/10

Halloween Party is the first album by American experimental music act Pink Anvil, released in 2003 by Ipecac Recordings.

== Track listing ==
All tracks written by Pink Anvil.

1. "Beginning" – 2:16
2. "Rubber Suit" – 4:01
3. "'Cause I Told You So" – 4:40
4. "Desert" – 6:30
5. "Adagio in Cb" – 3:57
6. "Downer" – 4:36
7. "Rubber Suit, Pt. 2" – 4:00
8. "Sugarwater" – 5:23
9. "Unmerry" – 3:10
10. "Near Death" – 4:54
11. "Ending" – 2:29
