= Romances (Kaada/Patton album) =

Studio album by Kaada/Patton
- Released: November 30, 2004
- Recorded: 2004
- Genre: Avant-garde music
- Length: 44:52
- Label: Ipecac Recordings (IPC-058)
- Producer: Kaada; Mike Patton

Kaada/Patton chronology
Romances (2004)	Kaada/Patton Live (2007)

Professional ratings
Review scores
Source	Rating
AllMusic	4/5 stars
Baltimore City Paper	(favorable)
Stylus Magazine	4.5/5 stars
Tiny Mix Tapes	4/5 stars

Romances is a 2004 collaboration album between Faith No More vocalist Mike Patton and Norwegian singer-songwriter Kaada. The overall sound of the album was inspired by Gustav Mahler, Frédéric Chopin, Johannes Brahms and Franz Liszt with soundtrack elements. The album's track titles were taken from 18th century French songs.

== Track listing ==
All lyrics are written by Kaada and Mike Patton; all music is composed by Kaada/Patton

No.	Title	English title	Length
1.	"Invocation"	Invocation	2:53
2.	"Pitié Pour Mes Larmes"	Pity for My Tears	5:31
3.	"Aubade"	Aubade	11:17
4.	"L'absent"	The Absent	3:04
5.	"Crépuscule"	Twilight	4:10
6.	"Viens, Les Gazons Sont Verts"	Come, the Lawns Are Green	6:59
7.	"Seule"	Alone	5:58
8.	"Pensée des Morts"	Thoughts of the Dead	4:37
9.	"Nuit Silencieuse"	Silent Night	3:19
Total length:			44:52
