= Marah Strauch =

American filmmaker

- Occupation: Filmmaker
- Website: www.marahstrauch.com

Marah Strauch is an Austrian American filmmaker. She has produced, written, and directed documentaries which include Vice Versa:Chyna and Sunshine Superman. Her film Space Cowboy premiered at the Toronto International Film Festival in 2024.

== Filmography ==
=== Film ===
- Sunshine Superman (2014)
- Highsmith (2021)
- Vice Versa:Chyna (2021)
- Larry Flynt for President (2021)
- Lady Buds (2021)
- Space Cowboy (2024)

=== Television ===
- House Hunters International (2018-19)
