= Ataxia (album) =

2008 album by Circus Devils

Studio album by Circus Devils
- Released: October 31, 2008
- Recorded: 2007 / 2008 at Waterloo Sound Recording in Kent, Ohio
- Genre: Experimental rock, alternative rock, psychedelic rock
- Label: Happy Jack Rock Records
- Producer: Todd Tobias

Circus Devils chronology
Sgt. Disco (2007)	Ataxia (2008)	Gringo (2009)

Professional ratings
Review scores
Source	Rating
Skyscraper Magazine	4.5/5 stars
The Sunday Times	3/5 stars
PopMatters	2/5 stars
Indieville.com	4/5 stars

Ataxia is the sixth studio album released by the American alternative/psychedelic rock band Circus Devils on October 31, 2008. All songs on Ataxia were written and performed by Robert Pollard, Todd Tobias, and Tim Tobias.

== Reaction ==
Steve Five for Skyscraper Magazine wrote,

The music jumps from dark crawlspace paranoia to sexy swaggering rock to postpunk jerky new wave to ethereal planes of exultation, all within matters of seconds. One moment you’re bobbing your head and the next moment you’re terrified, asking yourself, “What’s going on here? This is scaring me.” And though Circus Devils have always followed whatever crooked and strange or delicately beautiful paths they’ve chosen, their records have gotten consistently more and more intricate, refined, bold, and solid, Ataxia being their most dynamic and strange offering as of yet."

The London Sunday Times's Stewart Lee added,

The determinedly annoying Circus Devils' sixth album finds Robert Pollard sounding like a peyote-visionary lumberjack who has wandered into a rehearsal by a 1970s progressive-rock band, then edited the giant jams down into exhilarating two-minute slivers. Ataxia is Yes’s Tales From Topographic Oceans remade in miniature from pottery fragments and human toenail clippings.

Indieville.com wrote,

The overall tone of Ataxia is almost Gothic in its dark mystique. Songs seem to bubble up amidst a cauldron of haunting, atmospheric sounds. "Get Me Extra!," for example, emerges from an uneasy haze of feedback, while opener "Under Review" has to battle a morose drone in order to attain footing. This makes for an intriguing album that is more than a set of songs, but instead a continuing story; this, in turn, frames the record's better songs nicely.

== Track listing ==
1. "Under Review"
2. "I Razors"
3. "Freedom's Monster"
4. "That's the Spirit" (inst.)
5. "Backwash Television"
6. "The Girls Will Make It Happen"
7. "Mayflower Brought Disease"
8. "Stars, Stripes and Crack Pipes"
9. "Ataxia" (inst.)
10. "Nets at Every Angle"
11. "Hi, I'm Martha. How are you?"
12. "Lunatic Style"
13. "Get Me Extra!"
14. "I Found the Black Mind"
15. "He Had All Day"
16. "Fuzz in the Street"
17. "Rat Faced Ballerina"
