= Music for Moviebikers =

Studio album by Kaada
- Released: 11 July 2006
- Genre: Pop, alternative rock, experimental music
- Length: 1:00:00
- Label: Ipecac Recordings (IPC-079); Kaada Recordings
- Producer: Kaada

Kaada chronology
| MECD (2004) | Music for Moviebikers (2006) | Junkyard Nostalgias (2009) |

Professional ratings
Review scores
| Source | Rating |
|---|---|
| Allmusic | link |

Music for Moviebikers is the third album by Norwegian pop/experimental singer-songwriter Kaada. It was released in 2006 by Ipecac Recordings.

== Track listing ==
All tracks are written by Kaada.

| No. | Title | Length |
|---|---|---|
| 1. | "Smiger" | 4:37 |
| 2. | "Mainstreaming" | 4:39 |
| 3. | "From Here on It Got Rough" | 3:20 |
| 4. | "Spindle" | 5:29 |
| 5. | "The Mosquito and the Abandoned Old Woman" | 3:57 |
| 6. | "Julia Pastrana" | 4:42 |
| 7. | "No Man's Land" | 5:00 |
| 8. | "Daily Living" | 3:49 |
| 9. | "The Small Stuff" | 3:48 |
| 10. | "Celibate" | 7:20 |
| 11. | "Retirement Community" | 5:12 |
| 12. | "Birds of Prey" | 4:16 |
| 13. | "In Hora Mortis" | 3:46 |
| Total length: | | 1:00:00 |

== Personnel ==
Conducted by : Baldakhin

- Joe Young : vocals, keyboards, tannerin
- Cain Marko : clarinets
- Renate Engevold : violin
- Hanne Haarbye : viola
- Håvard Bilsbak : Cello
- Sigrun Eng : Cello
- Riccardo Ghazala : Dulcitone
- Jane Helen Johansen : Kalimba, acc guitars, mandolin, vocals
- Sergiov Scarlatto : Dulcimer, Stoessel-laute
- Øyvind Storesund – whistling
- Nikolai Hængsle Eilertsen : el-bass, Fender bass VI, e sitar
- Sergiov Scarlatto : Dulcimer, Stoessel-laute
- Erland Dahlen : Perc
- Else Olsen Storesund – harding fiddle
- Ziv Weissmuller : Psaltery
- Børge Fjordheim : drums
- Dan Dare : mallets
- Rolf Y. Uggen : el-guitar
- Marte Wulff : vocal
- Theresa Drift : vocal, Glass Harmonica
- Geir Sundstøl : steelguitar and el-guitar (Number 8)
- Per Zanussi : Saw

Lyrics on 2 by Sidna Ali the Moslem (9th Century)

- Mixed by Kaada at Wrongroom
- Mastering by Frank ArkWright
- Design by Martin Kvamme
- Photos by Observatoriet
