= Circus Devils =

American rock band

- left to right: Tim Tobias, Robert Pollard, Todd Tobias

Background information
- Origin: Ohio, U.S.
- Genres: Alternative rock, experimental rock, psychedelic rock, indie rock, art rock
- Years active: 2001–2017, 2023-present
- Labels: Happy Jack Rock Records; Ipecac; Rockathon Records; Guided by Voices, Inc.
- Members: Robert Pollard; Todd Tobias; Tim Tobias

Circus Devils is an American psychedelic rock band founded in 2001 by Robert Pollard, best known as the lead singer and songwriter of the Dayton, Ohio, band Guided by Voices. The band consists of Pollard (vocals and lyrics), Todd Tobias (music and production), and Tim Tobias (music).

Circus Devils employs a wide spectrum of musical styles, ranging from acid rock to ambient soundscapes. On the band's web site, the music is described as "garage-prog, or art rock made by cave men."

== History ==
Circus Devils was originally conceived in 2001 as a side project to Robert Pollard's main work with Guided by Voices. Between 2001 and 2023, the band released 15 full-length albums. Beginning with the release of their first album, Ringworm Interiors, Circus Devils dismissed the styles of Pollard's other musical endeavors for a more experimental approach, taking an ominous and nightmarish tone, exploring the themes of good and evil. According to the group's whimsical website bio, Circus Devils formed because a dog-faced man approached each member on separate occasions to deliver the message, "Circus Devils is Real." Like this story, the song lyrics are often unsettling fictional tales of horror delivered within deconstructed rock operas. Each Circus Devils album is distinguished by a theme, concept, or production style which sets it apart from the band's other albums.

In 2007, the band's 5th album Sgt. Disco was released on Mike Patton's Ipecac Recordings record label.

Band member and producer Todd Tobias authored a book in 2019 titled Circus Devils: See You Inside, published by Tiny Room in The Netherlands.

== Discography ==
=== Studio albums ===
- Ringworm Interiors (2001)
- The Harold Pig Memorial (2002)
- Pinball Mars (2003)
- Five (2005)
- Sgt. Disco (2007)
- Ataxia (2008)
- Gringo (2009)
- Mother Skinny (2010)
- Capsized! (2011)
- When Machines Attack (2013)
- My Mind Has Seen the White Trick (2013)
- Escape (2014)
- Stomping Grounds (2015)
- Laughs Last (2017)
- Squeeze the Needle (2023)

=== Compilations ===
- Laughs Best (The Kids Eat It Up) (2017)

== Reviews ==
- Circus Devils - Ringworm Interiors - Album Review at ALLMUSIC by Bart Bealmear
- Circus Devils - The Harold Pig Memorial - Album Review at ALLMUSIC by Karen E. Graves
- Circus Devils - Pinball Mars - Album Review at ALLMUSIC by Bart Bealmear
- Circus Devils - Sgt. Disco - Album Review at PITCHFORK by Adam Moerder (12 September, 2007)
- Circus Devils - ATAXIA - Album Review at Indieville (27 October, 2008)
- Circus Devils - Gringo - Album Review at ERASING CLOUDS by Dave Heaton (30 March, 2009)
- Circus Devils - Mother Skinny - Album Review at POPMATTERS by Matthew Fiander (1 April, 2010)
- Circus Devils - Capsized! - Album Review at POPMATTERS
