= Pink Anvil =

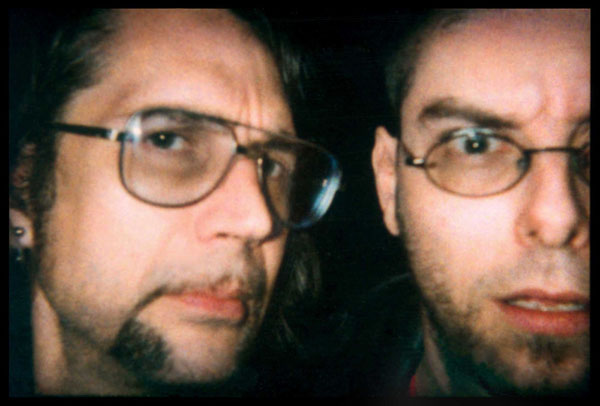
- Pink Anvil, circa 2003

Background information
- Origin: Austin, Texas, United States
- Genres: Experimental
- Years active: 2001, 2003
- Labels: Ipecac; Stacked
- Members: Paul Barker; Max Brody
- Website: Ipecac.com

Pink Anvil was a duo consisting of former members of the group Ministry - Paul Barker and Max Brody.

The pair formed during a time of personal turmoil in Ministry, which due to drug abuse and record label disagreements nearly ended the group. Upon an invitation from one Dave Palmer (of the jazz group Earl Harvin Trio), they performed an experimental set at a small rave in Austin, Texas on Halloween, 2001. The recorded set was later released as Halloween Party on Ipecac Recordings in 2003.

Pink Anvil made another live appearance at the New Year's Eve Ipecac bash in San Francisco, California at Great American Music Hall. This show was also recorded and was released posthumously in 2014.

Brody has stated that plans for a third album were slightly recorded, though not completed as Barker had moved to Los Angeles in 2004. A finished version of these recordings was self-released by Brody under the title Cubed in 2015.

== Discography ==
- Halloween Party (2003, Ipecac)
- New Years Eve Party (2014, self-released)
- Cubed (2015, self-released)
