= Sgt. Disco =

2007 album by Circus Devils

Studio album by Circus Devils
- Released: August 28, 2007
- Recorded: 2006 / 2007 at Waterloo Sound Recording
- Genre: Psychedelic rock, experimental rock, alternative rock, art rock
- Length: 67:00
- Label: Ipecac Recordings
- Producer: Todd Tobias

Circus Devils chronology
| Five (2005) | Sgt. Disco (2007) | Ataxia (2008) |

Professional ratings
Review scores
| Source | Rating |
|---|---|
| AllMusic | 4.0/5 stars |
| Spin | 1.5/5 stars |
| Filter | 4/5 stars |
| Weekly Dig | 4/5 stars |
| Tiny Mix Tapes | 4/5 stars |
| pitchforkmedia | 3/5 stars |

Sgt. Disco is the fifth studio album by the Ohio psychedelic/experimental rock band Circus Devils. The album was released first as a double-vinyl LP. The CD version of the album was released by Mike Patton's Ipecac Recordings label on August 28, 2007. Sgt. Disco features Robert Pollard on vocals and Todd Tobias on all instruments and atmospheres.

== Reception ==
On behalf of AllMusic, Jason Lymangrover wrote,

The first line of In Your Office sums up the fifth Circus Devils album Sgt. Disco nicely: "There is beautiful pandemonium." . . . the songs run the gamut from bizarre skeletal sludge topped with psychedelic bits and strange pseudo-poetics to greasy mock grunge rock. Like them or not, you have to respect the Devils' idiosyncratic tenacity and their relentless pursuit of a wild artistic vision. If you're into the eccentric, wedge this one between your Syd Barrett and Frogs CDs and brace yourself for one hell of a trip.

Boston's Weekly Dig added,

Shanties, Throbbing Gristle-esque loops and noises, stoner jams and mini-pop-operas all piled like vignettes and miniatures averaging about 90 seconds. But they pile carefully, thoroughly producing a world within each. No lo-fi sketchbooks mastered to CD here.

== Track listing ==
1. "Zig Zag"
2. "In Madonna's Gazebo"
3. "George Took a Shovel"
4. "Pattern Girl"
5. "Nicky Highpockets"
6. "Love Hate Relationship with the Human Race"
7. "Brick Soul Mascots (Part 1)"
8. "Break My Leg"
9. "Outlasting Girafalo"
10. "The Assassins Ballroom (Get Your Ass In)"
11. "The Winner's Circle"
12. "The Constable's Headscape"
13. "In Your Office"
14. "New Boy"
15. "Puke it Up"
16. "Swing Shift"
17. "Happy Zones"
18. "The Pit Fighter"
19. "Bogus Reactions"
20. "Hot Lettuce"
21. "Safer Than Hooking"
22. "Dead Duck Dinosaur"
23. "Do This"
24. "Brick Soul Mascots (Part 2)"
25. "Caravan"
26. "Lance the Boiling Son"
27. "War Horsies"
28. "French Horn Litigation"
29. "The Baby That Never Smiled"
30. "Man of Spare Parts"
31. "Rose in Paradise"
32. "Summer is Set"
