= Junkyard Nostalgias =

2009 studio album by Kaada

Studio album by Kaada
- Released: 23 February 2009
- Genres: Instrumental pop, alternative rock, experimental
- Length: 43:32
- Labels: Kaada Recordings (KAAA-016)
- Producer: Kaada

Kaada chronology
Music for Moviebikers (2006)	Junkyard Nostalgias (2009)

Junkyard Nostalgias is the fourth album by Norwegian pop/experimental singer-songwriter Kaada. It was Kaada's second album not to be released by Ipecac Recordings (the first being MECD) — instead, it was released by his own label, Kaada Recordings.

The album comes with eleven postcards depicting Polish landscapes.

== Track listing ==
All tracks are written by Kaada.

No.	Title	Length
1.	"A Day and a Night and a Day"	4:36
2.	"Truth Serum"	4:00
3.	"Ode to the Old Flesh"	4:21
4.	"Hammering Down the Nails"	3:06
5.	"Dragging an Ox"	4:14
6.	"Marja Dalia, the Polska Bogini"	3:35
7.	"Broken Horse Restaurant"	4:13
8.	"Late Bloomer Gipsiara"	4:01
9.	"The Hermetic Bird"	3:50
10.	"All the Things That Grow Old and Pass Away"	3:21
11.	"We Salute You, Polish Working Man"	5:12
Total length:		43:32

== Personnel ==
- Martin Kvamme – cover design
