= Bent Hamer =

Norwegian film director, writer and producer

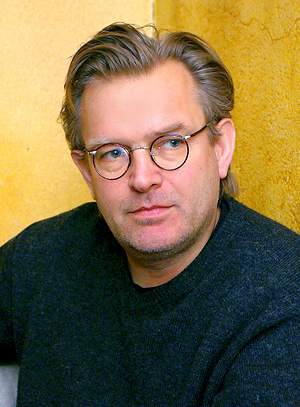
- Born: 18 December 1956 (age 68); Sandefjord, Norway
- Occupation(s): film director, writer, producer

Bent Hamer (born 18 December 1956) is a film director, writer and producer, born in Sandefjord, Norway in 1956.

== Biography ==
Hamer studied film theory and literature at the Stockholm University and the Stockholm Film School. In addition to his feature films, he has written and directed a number of short films and documentaries. His first film, Eggs, premiered at the 1995 Cannes Film Festival where it was shown in the Directors' Fortnight section. That same year, it was shown in competition at the 19th Moscow International Film Festival where it won the award for Best First Film; it also received the FIPRESCI Prize at the 1995 Toronto International Film Festival. His 2003 film Kitchen Stories screened at many international festivals and was the Norwegian submission for the Academy Award for Best Foreign Language Film.

In April 2004, Bent Hamer started shooting Factotum based on the novel of the same name by US poet and writer Charles Bukowski. The screenplay was written by Hamer and Jim Stark (Mystery Train, Cold Fever), who produced the film together with Christine Walker (American Splendor). The film premiered at the Kosmorama Film Festival in Trondheim, Norway, on April 12, 2005.

Hamer is the owner and founder of the BulBul Film Association, established in Oslo in 1994.

== Filmography ==
=== Feature films ===
- Eggs, 1995
- Water Easy Reach (En dag til i solen), 1998
- Kitchen Stories (Salmer fra kjøkkenet), 2003
- Factotum, 2005
- O' Horten, 2008
- Home for Christmas, 2010
- 1001 Grams (2014)
- The Middle Man (2021)

=== Short films ===
- Rødvyn Aargang 81, 1981
- Longitude Latitude (Makrellen er kommen), 1989
- Happy Hour, 1990 (co-director: Jörgen Bergmark)
- Sunday Dinner (Søndagsmiddag), 1990
- Stone (Stein), 1992
- Applause (Applaus), 1993
- Just for the hell of it (Bare kødd), 1995

=== Documentaries ===
- Courage to Dignity (Mot til verdighet), 1994
- Norway the Conqueror (Norge erobreren), part of documentary series 2001–05
