= Kaada/Patton =

Musical project

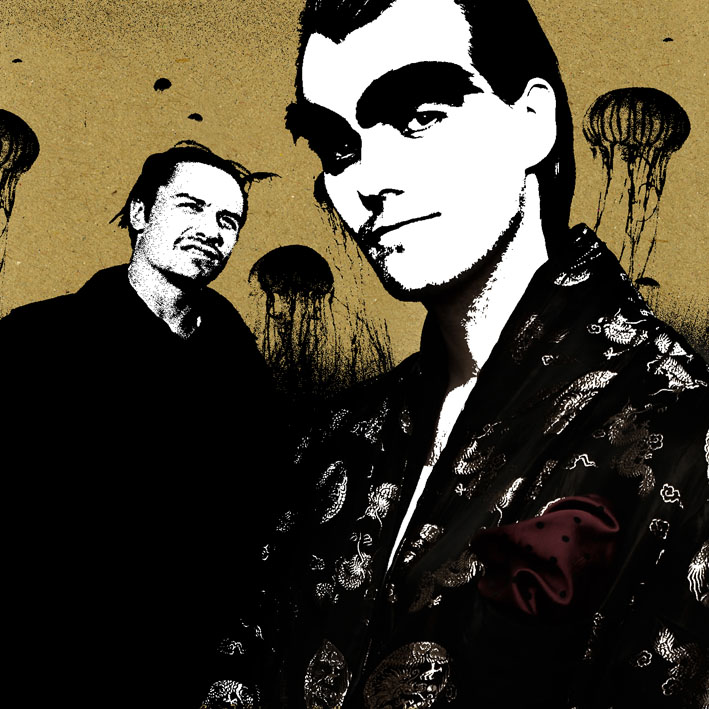

Background information
- Genres: Experimental, avant-garde
- Labels: Ipecac
- Members: Mike Patton; John Kaada
- Website: kaadapatton.com

Kaada/Patton is a musical project of two musicians, Kaada and Mike Patton.

== Discography ==
- Romances (2004)
- Live (2007)
- Bacteria Cult (2016)

== See also ==
- Mike Patton
- Ipecac Recordings
- Kaada
