= John Erik Kaada =

Norwegian musician (born 1975)

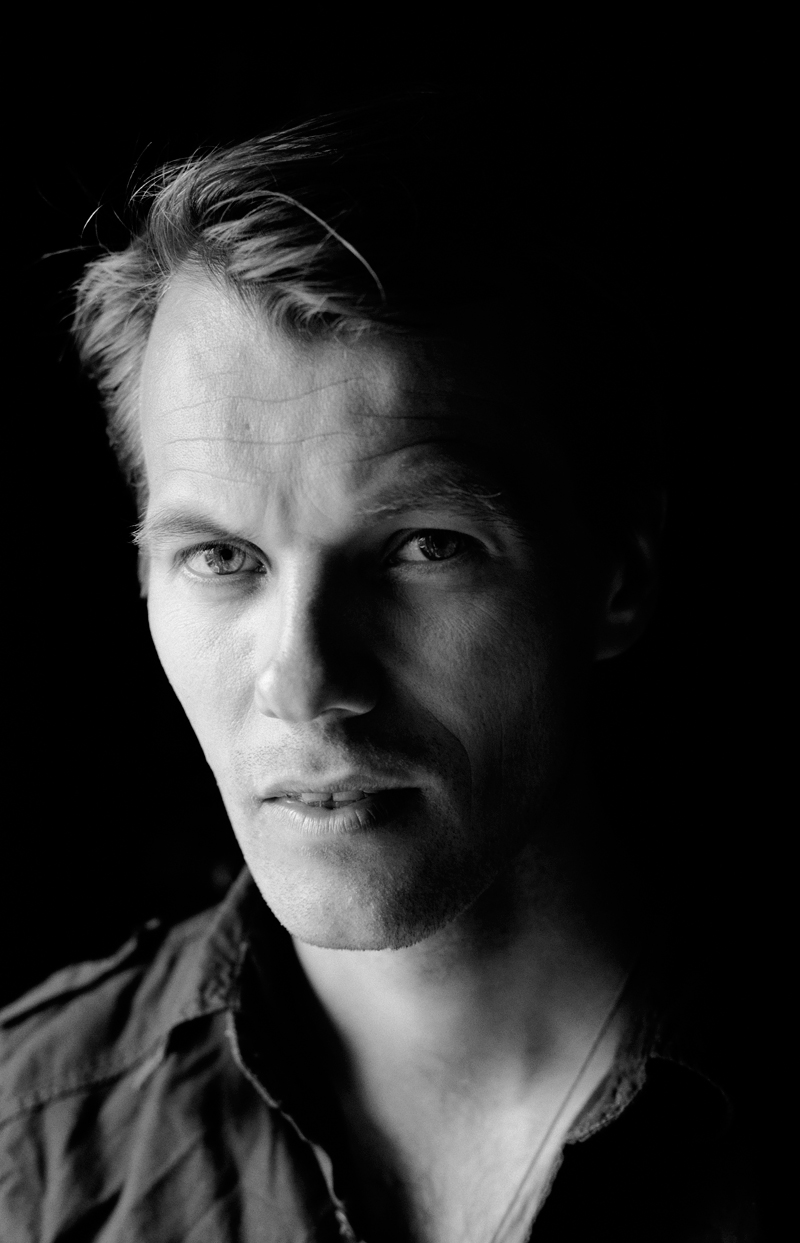
- Kaada in 2012

Background information
- Also known as: Kaada
- Born: 28 July 1975 (age 50); Stavanger, Rogaland, Norway
- Genres: Experimental music Electronic music Film score Avant-garde; Vocal music Classical; Noise music Instrumental pop Trip hop
- Occupations: Musician, songwriter
- Instruments: Vocals, drums, electronics, samples, keyboards, guitars, bass, flute, harp
- Years active: 1996–present
- Labels: Ipecac, Kaada Recordings
- Website: kaada.no

John Erik Kaada (born 28 July 1975), also known by the mononym Kaada, is a Norwegian singer-songwriter, producer, film score composer and multi-instrumentalist. Kaada's career spans a string of solo albums, motion picture soundtracks, high-profile collaborations with key players such as Mike Patton, as well as numerous live appearances at home and abroad.

== Discography ==
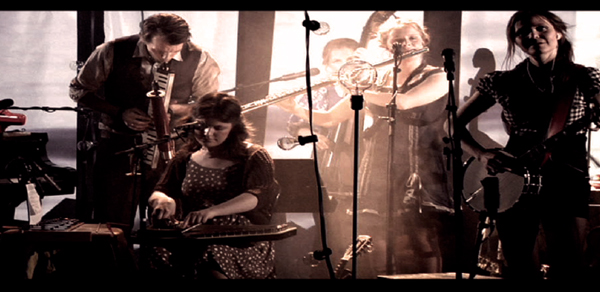
John Erik Kaada (left) performing with KAADA ORKESTER.

Kaada Recordings
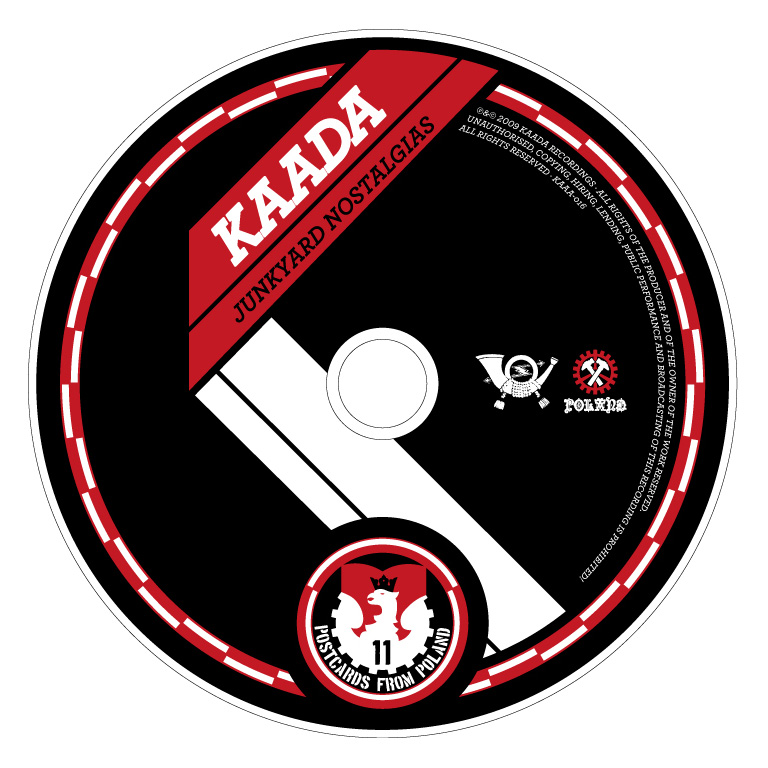
- Founded: 1998
- Founder: Kaada
- Distributors: RED (US), PIAS (worldwide), Fontana (Canada), Rillbar (DK), Phonofile (worldwide digital)
- Genre: Various
- Country of origin: Norway
- Location: Oslo, Norway
- Official website: http://www.kaada.no

Kaada Recordings is a Norwegian label dedicated to releasing or licensing out the music of composer John Erik Kaada.

=== Solo albums ===
- Thank You for Giving Me Your Valuable Time (2001 – re-released in 2003)
- MECD (2004)
- Music for Moviebikers (2006)
- Junkyard Nostalgias (2009)
- Kaada & The Late Bloomers in Concert (2012)
- Closing Statements (2018)
- Misinterpretations (2021)
- And if in a thousand years (2023)

Kaada's debut album, Thank You for Giving Me Your Valuable Time (2001), blends doo-wop, show tunes, and jungle rhythms with live instrumentation and electronic elements. Billboard named it one of the ten most important releases of the year.

Music for Moviebikers (2006, Ipecac Recordings) is a collection of orchestral arrangements conceived as soundtracks for imaginary films. The 22-piece ensemble includes strings, vocals, electric guitars, homemade instruments, and European folk musicians. The strings were recorded in the Vigeland mausoleum in Oslo.

Junkyard Nostalgias (2009) was conceived as a homage to Polish migrant workers in Norway. Kaada played all instruments on the album, which he has said he made "to justify buying hundreds of instruments on eBay."

=== Kaada/Patton albums ===
- Romances (2004)
- Bacteria Cult (2016)

In 2004, Kaada released Romances with Faith No More and Tomahawk vocalist Mike Patton. The album takes its titles from the Romantic period, with influences including Franz Liszt, Johannes Brahms, Gustav Mahler, Debussy, Maurice Ravel, and Béla Bartók. The album's nine tracks are structured as a single symphonic work.

The Kaada/Patton Live DVD (Ipecac Recordings, 2007) captures a seven-piece ensemble performing material from Romances at the 2005 Roskilde Festival.

Kaada and Patton released a second album, Bacteria Cult, in 2016.

=== Cloroform albums ===
- Deconstruction (Kaada Records, 1998)
- All-Scars (Kaada Records, 1998)
- Do the Crawl (Kaada Records, 2000)
- Scrawl (album) (Kaada Records, 2001)
- Hey You Let's Kiss (Kaada Records, 2003)
- Cracked Wide Open (Kaada Records, 2005)
- Clean (Kaada Records, 2007)
- Grrr (Cloroform album) (Kaada Records, 2016)

Kaada is a member of the exploratory trio Cloroform, which was most active from 1998 to 2006 and toured extensively in Europe. The group uses double bass, drums, keyboards, and distorted vocals.

=== DVD releases ===
- 2007 – Kaada/Patton Live – Live performance DVD Kaada/Patton Live is a DVD of the collaboration between Mike Patton and John Kaada that was released on 20 November 2007. The DVD features a live performance of the music from the album Romances from Roskilde Festival 2005. The entire concert is in black & white.
- 2008 – O' Horten DVD – interview together with director Bent Hamer
- 2012 – Kaada and the Late Bloomers in Concert – live DVD

== Film music ==
Kaada began composing for film with Mongoland (2000). In 2002, he received the Golden Clapboard Prize at the Amanda Award, becoming the youngest recipient at the time. He has since composed scores for Norwegian and international productions, including O' Horten (2008), 1001 Grams (2014), and the French film La liste de mes envies (2014). His documentary work includes Sunshine Superman (2015) and Cold Case Hammarskjöld (2019).

=== Selected film scores ===
Country	Film	Director	Year
Norway; Sweden; Finland	Árru	Elle Sofe Sara	2026
Denmark	Cold Case Hammarskjöld	Mads Brügger	2019
Norway	The Absence of Eddy Table	Rune Spaans	2016
Finland	Diving into the Unknown	Juan Reina	2016
USA	Sunshine Superman	Marah Strauch	2015
Norway	1001 Grams	Bent Hamer	2014
France	La liste de mes envies	Didier Le Pêcheur	2014
Sweden	Flimmer	Patrik Eklund	2012
Norway	Home for Christmas	Bent Hamer	2010
Norway	O' Horten	Bent Hamer	2008
Norway	The Man Who Loved Yngve	Stian Kristiansen	2008
USA	The Lost	Chris Sivertson	2006
Norway	Hawaii, Oslo	Erik Poppe	2004
Sweden	Tur & retur	Ella Lemhagen	2003
Norway	7th Heaven	Steffan Strandberg	2004
USA	Journey	Warren Miller	2003
Norway	Alt om min far	Even Benestad	2002
Norway	Mongoland	Arild Østin Ommundsen	2000

=== Soundtrack releases ===
- Music from the Motion Picture Natural Born Star (2007)
- Music from the Motion Picture O'Horten (2008)
- La liste de mes envies (2014)
- Diving into the Unknown (2016)
- Zombielars (2019)

== See also ==
- Mike Patton
- Ipecac Recordings
- Cloroform
- Kaada/Patton
