= Martin Kvamme =

Norwegian graphic designer (born 1975)

- Born: 12 September 1975 (age 50); Bergen, Norway
- Occupations: Graphic designer; illustrator
- Website: unitdeltaplus.com

Martin Kvamme (born 12 September 1975) is a Norwegian graphic designer and illustrator who has created artwork for musical artists including a-ha, The Avett Brothers, Brandi Carlile, Faith No More, Satyricon, Sigur Rós, Turbonegro, and Ween.

The Japanese design journal Idea named him as part of the "new generation of Norwegian graphic designers", and he has been described by Norwegian press as one of the country's leading album cover designers. His work has been exhibited at London's Design Museum and recognized by the British design journal Creative Review. Works by Kvamme are in the permanent collection of the National Museum of Norway.

== Early life ==
Kvamme was born in Bergen, Norway, on 12 September 1975.

== Career ==
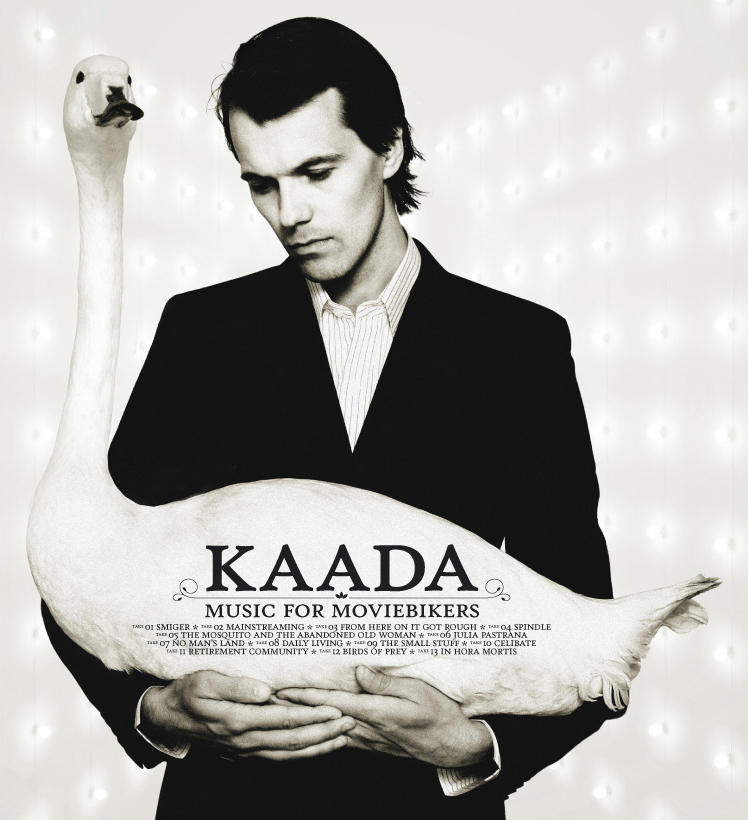
Kvamme's cover for Kaada's album Music for Moviebikers (2006)

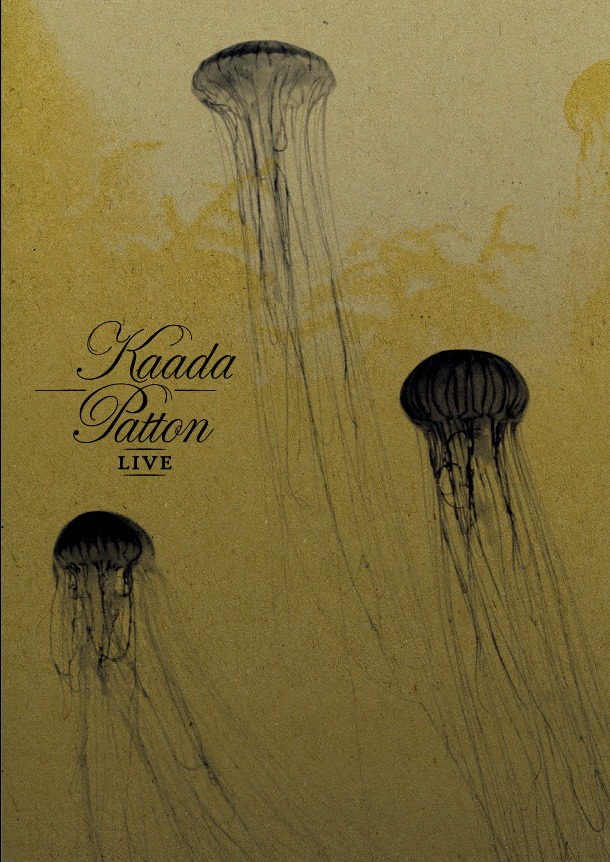
Kvamme's cover for Kaada/Patton's DVD Live (2007)

He began working in advertising in 1994 and later joined the Oslo-based architecture firm Snøhetta as a graphic designer. Kvamme runs a one-man studio called The Unit Delta Plus.

The first album cover he designed was Even "Magnet" Johansen's debut album. Kvamme met American musician Mike Patton in the summer of 2000 and became a regular collaborator, designing album covers for Patton's groups Faith No More, Fantômas, Kaada/Patton, and Tomahawk. His work for Patton led to the cover commission for The Avett Brothers' The Carpenter (2012). He has designed for several international artists.

== Selected works ==
- Bertine Zetlitz – Sweet Injections (2003), album cover. Received the Merket for god design (transl. Mark of Good Design) from the Norwegian Design Council, the first CD cover to win the award.
- Magnet – "Last Day of Summer" (2003), 12-inch single. Exhibited in The European Design Show at London's Design Museum in 2005.
- Burton snowboard (2007), based on his cover art for Tomahawk's Mit Gas (2003). Won gold in graphic design at the Gullblyanten. In the National Museum of Norway's permanent collection.
- Dub Trio – Another Sound Is Dying (2008), album cover. Won gold at Visuelt for cultural packaging.
- Ravner poster (2008), with Raymond Mozer. Won gold at Visuelt for illustration.
- Pieces of Energy (2008), art book, with Halvor Bodin. Won gold at Visuelt for catalogs and brochures.
- Jaga Jazzist – Starfire (2015), album cover. Named one of the top ten album covers of 2015 by Creative Review. Exhibited in the Norwegian Museum of Decorative Arts and Design's Plateomslag – vinylens comeback (transl. Album Covers: The Vinyl Comeback). In the National Museum of Norway's permanent collection.

== Recognition ==
His work has been published in several design anthologies:

- 55 Degrees North: Contemporary Scandinavian Graphic Design (Laurence King Publishing, 2002)
- Sonic! Visuals for Music (Die Gestalten Verlag, 2004)
- Dos Logos (Die Gestalten Verlag, 2004)
- Business Cards 2 (Laurence King Publishing, 2006)
- Web Design Index by Content .03 (Pepin Press, 2007)
- Around Europe Promotion (Index Book, 2008)

In 2008, Kvamme was nominated for Norsk Form's award for young designers.
