= Guro Skumsnes Moe =

Norwegian upright bassist, composer and singer

- Born: 1983 (age 41–42); Hedemark
- Origin: Norway
- Genres: Jazz Rock Metal Experimental
- Occupation: Musician
- Instruments: Upright bass, electric bass, vocals
- Labels: ConradSound
- Website: MoE on Bandcamp

Guro Skumsnes Moe (born 1983 in Hedemark, Norway) is a Norwegian Upright bass player, electric bass player, composer and singer. Dance, improvisation, rock, jazz and noise music, are all elements that are important to her expression.

== Career ==
Moe is a bassist and vocalist that has managed to make her mark on the Norwegian music scenes, both on and off stage. She has her musical background from the Music conservatory in Kristiansand and the Norwegian Academy of Music in Oslo, where she graduated 2007, she has distinguished herself as an active performer with wide field of interest on the Oslo's jazz and free impro music scene recent years.

Her main project is considered to be the experimental and cross-genre band MoE. A band that has toured large parts of the world and released a multitude of releases. The band has collaborated with musicians such as Keiji Haino, Painjerk, Mette Rasmussen, Lasse Marhaug and many more.

The national museum for popular music Rockheim opened in January 2022 an exhibition about MoE curated by Lasse Marhaug.

Moe has also written music for the vocal ensemble Oslo 14, the British orchestra Paraorchestra, written film music for "The Untamed "by the Mexican director Amat Escalante and written music for several performances for the puppet theater company Plexus Polaire.

== Honors ==
- 2009: "Statkrafts Young Star scholarships" at Oslo Jazzfestival
- 2022 Hedda prize for best audiovisual design for "Moby Dick" by Plexus Polaire.

== Discography ==
=== Solo albums ===
  - 2009: Telling lies, 7” (ConradSound)
  - 2011: It Pictures (Conrad Sound)
  - 2013: Oslo Janus (Conrad Sound)
  - MoE/The Observatory 12” split single (ConradSound 2013)
  - David Yow 7” (ConradSound 2013)
  - 2014: 3 (Conrad Sound)
  - Oslo Janus II (ConradSound 2014)
  - Oslo Janus III (ConradSound 2016)
  - Examination of the eye a horse (ConradSound, 2016)
  - Karaoke (ConradSound 2017)
  - Shadows (ConradSound 2018)
  - Capsaicin (Utech/ConradSound/Substrata 2018)
  - Oslo Janus IV (ConradSound 2019)
  - Purple Aki/Dirty Dancing (God Unknown Records 2019)
  - «La bufa» (ConradSound 2019)
  - «Tolerancia Picante» (ConradSound 2020)
  - «Vi som elsket kaos» (ConradSound 2020)
  - «Painted» (Relative Pitch, 2020)
  - 2021: MoE/Descartes A Kant - Christmas (ConradSound 2021)
  - 2022: MoE – «The Crone» – (Vinter Records 2022)

=== Collaborative works ===
With «Bay/Oslo Mirror Trio»

- 2010: Bay/Oslo Mirror Trio (Conrad Sound)
- Meek/MoE/Escalante/Skaset – «Scrap» – (Discos Astromelia 2021)

With «Sekstett»

- 2010: Sekstett (Conrad Sound)

With «Blue Faced People» duo including Håvard Skaset

- 2010: Blue Faced People (Conrad Sound)
- 2014: Blueface People- Gold (ConradSound)
- 2020 Bluefaced People – "Drums are us"

With «Sult»

- 2012: Bark (Bug Incision Records)
- 2013: Harm (Bocian Records)
- 2014: Svimmelhed (Conrad Sound)
- 2016 Sult – Harpoon (ConradSound/Pica disk)

With «Gjerstad-Skaset-Tafjord-Mølstad-Moe»

- 2013: Deichman (Conrad Sound)

With «kÖök»

- 2013: Imber, Wiltshire (Va Fongool)
