= Mike Patton =

American singer (born 1968)

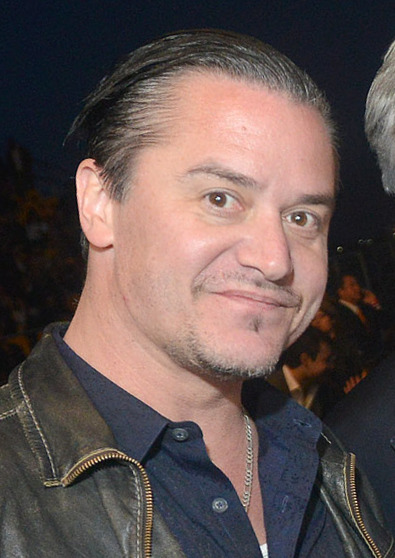
- Patton in 2013

Background information
- Born: Michael Allan Patton; January 27, 1968 (age 58); Eureka, California, U.S.
- Genres: Avant-garde; alternative metal; funk metal; alternative rock; experimental rock; art pop; contemporary classical
- Occupations: Singer; songwriter; voice actor; record producer; film composer
- Instruments: Vocals; keyboards; samples
- Years active: 1984–present
- Member of: Faith No More; Mr. Bungle; Fantômas; Tomahawk; AVTT/PTTN; Dead Cross
- Formerly of: Peeping Tom; Lovage; Kaada/Patton; Hemophiliac; Nevermen

Michael Allan Patton (born January 27, 1968) is an American singer, songwriter, producer, and voice actor, best known as the lead vocalist of the rock bands Faith No More and Mr. Bungle. He has also fronted and/or played with Tomahawk, The Dillinger Escape Plan, Fantômas, Moonchild Trio, Kaada/Patton, Dead Cross, Lovage, Mondo Cane, the X-ecutioners, The Avett Brothers, and Peeping Tom. Consistent collaborators through his varied career include avant-garde jazz saxophonist John Zorn, hip-hop producer Dan the Automator and classical violinist Eyvind Kang. Patton saw his largest commercial success with Faith No More; although they scored only one US hit, they scored three UK top 20 singles.

Noted for his vocal proficiency, diverse singing techniques, wide range of projects, style-transcending influences, eccentric public image and contempt for the music industry, Patton has earned critical praise and influenced many contemporary singers. He has been cited as an influence by members of Coheed and Cambria, Deftones, Dog Fashion Disco, Five Finger Death Punch, Flummox, Hoobastank, Incubus, Killswitch Engage, Korn, Lostprophets, Mushroomhead, Papa Roach, Queens of the Stone Age, System of a Down, and Slipknot.

Patton has worked as a producer or co-producer with artists such as Merzbow, The Dillinger Escape Plan, Sepultura, Melvins, Melt-Banana, and Kool Keith. He co-founded Ipecac Recordings with Greg Werckman in 1999, and has run the label since. Patton is an outspoken, even derisive, critic of the mainstream music industry and has been a champion for non-mainstream music that he says has "fallen through the cracks."

== Early years ==
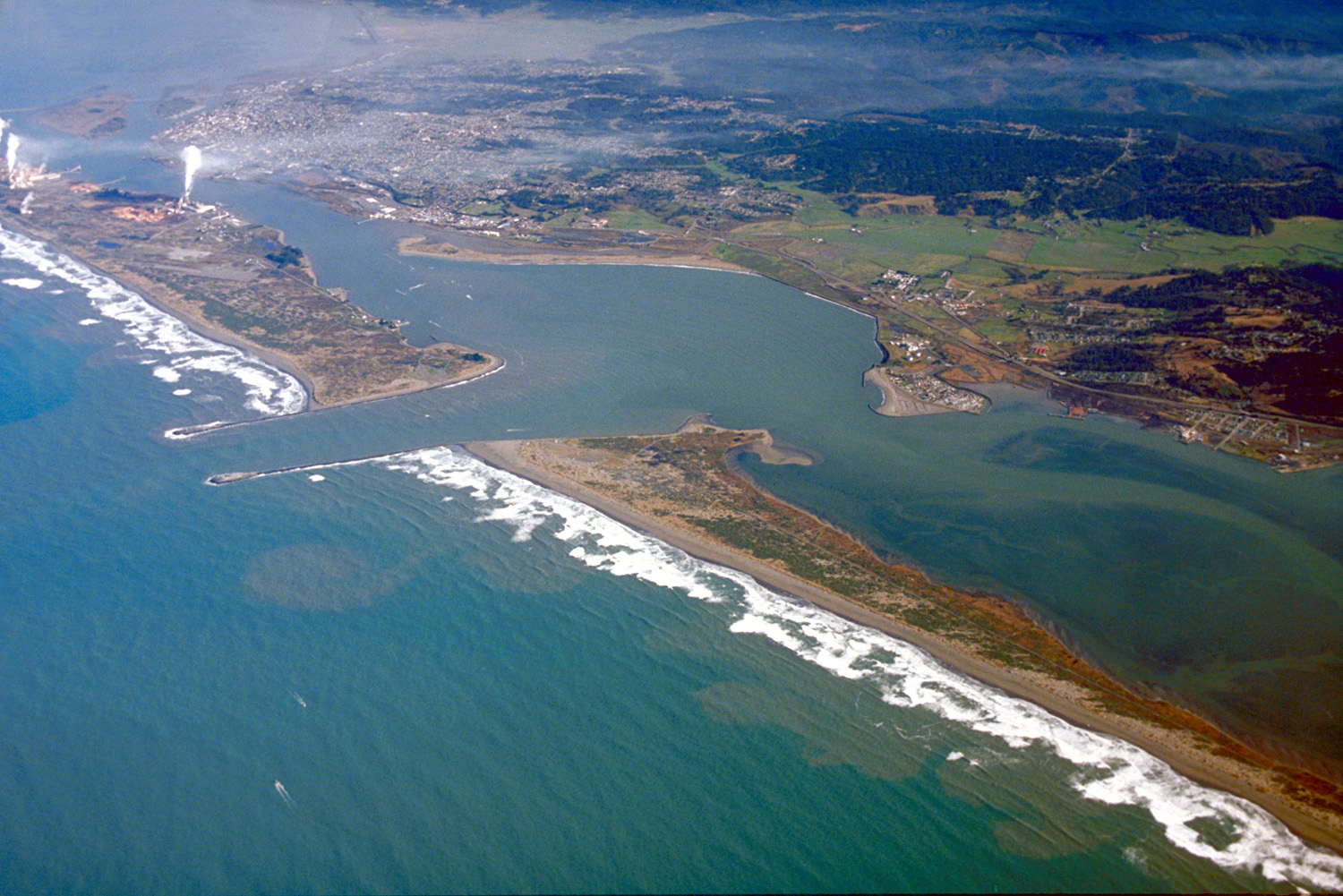
Eureka, the town where Patton grew up. By the 1970s, Eureka had around 25,000 inhabitants.

Mike Patton was born in Eureka, California on January 27, 1968, to a social worker mother and a physical education teacher father. Patton's home was strictly secular. During his first years, his family had an apartment in San Jose, California, in which they spent much time before they permanently relocated to Eureka. Patton says he has written recreationally for as long as he can remember. Due to his father's profession, Patton grew up as a sports enthusiast and practiced them regularly until his touring career began in 1989. One of his early musical memories was listening to his father's records by Earth, Wind & Fire and Frank Zappa; however, at the time, the artists never left a significant impression on Patton. In elementary school, he was a good student and athlete, but had very few friends due to his focus on getting good grades. As an "escape valve", he regularly asked his parents to drop him off at the movies, where he secretly watched slasher films and Star Wars, and the latter's soundtrack impacted him deeply. He and his bandmates have consistently credited their early years in Eureka, a relatively isolated city in the far north of California, to the intense curiosity that would drive their future career paths. Although his family did not have an artistic background, Patton was thankful for the freedom they granted him, which further led him toward music.

Patton studied at Eureka High School where he met bassist Trevor Dunn and later guitarist Trey Spruance, both members of its music theory class and jazz ensembles. Patton got to know Dunn through trading records, and they bonded over their studiousness, sarcastic humor and disaffection. Both were part of the cover band Gemini that performed songs by popular heavy metal groups. They quickly gained interest in heavier styles and joined the thrash metal cover band Fiend, but were kicked out and subsequently recorded a death metal tape under the name Turd, with Dunn on vocals and Patton on the instruments. Although Patton was "pretty well-adjusted and well-liked by [his middle school] peers", he had a "hyper geek" personality and felt increasingly alienated from sportspeople; ultimately, he found a supportive environment in the death metal music scene where he shifted his focus from sports to art. He and Dunn also had punk friends and started to branch out to that subculture; neither musician wanted to be associated with the drug epidemic in Eureka nor the school's party scene, thus they soon self-identified as straight edge. On the other hand, Trey Spruance and Jed Watts were members of Torchure, a Mercyful Fate-inspired band that had played with Patton's Fiend, and they formed another two-piece extreme metal band called FCA. Eventually, the four musicians joined up and established Mr. Bungle in 1984. In November, they performed its first show in the adjacent town of Bayside, California. Dunn, Spruance and Patton "pretty much hated everyone" at school and hung out alone next to the tennis courts outside campus. To pass the time, they often engaged in late night freighthopping, getting off at nearby towns or remote, wooded areas, and relying on hitchhiking to find their way home. While they disliked the cultural vapidness and degradation of the area, they appreciated their school teachers who nurtured their artistic interests; an English teacher turned Patton onto Marquis de Sade and The Painted Bird by Jerzy Kosiński, while Dan Horton, their music teacher, let them use the music room after school and even joined them as a temporary horn player at a show.

Patton enrolled in California State Polytechnic University, Humboldt, located in the nearby town of Arcata, California, to study English literature with plans to become a writer. He performed very well in college and wrote numerous short stories of varied genres, while at the time music was an enjoyable yet not-too-serious hobby for Patton. At Humboldt, Patton met his future band Faith No More during a 1986 show at a pizza parlor, where Mr. Bungle played numerous times. After the performance, Spruance, who had invited Patton to the show, gave drummer Mike Bordin Mr. Bungle's demo The Raging Wrath of the Easter Bunny. From school to college, Patton also worked part-time at the only record store in Eureka until he joined Faith No More in 1988.

During the late 1980s, Mr. Bungle released a number of demos on cassette only: 1986's The Raging Wrath of the Easter Bunny, 1987's Bowel of Chiley, 1988's Goddammit I Love America and 1989's OU818. The last three feature tracks that would later be included on their 1991 debut studio release.

== Music career ==
=== Faith No More: 1988–1998; 2009–2021; 2026–present ===
Remembering Mr. Bungle's first demo tape, The Raging Wrath of the Easter Bunny, the members of Faith No More approached Patton to audition as their lead singer in 1988. The band tried out more than fifteen singers to fill the role, including Chris Cornell from Soundgarden, but they settled on Patton in view of his versatility. Over the next few months, they performed a few live shows together. Patton would be officially announced as their new singer in January 1989, replacing Chuck Mosley; this forced Patton to quit his studies at Humboldt State University. Mosley subsequently formed the bands Cement and VUA, and had several special "one-off" performances at shows with Faith No More and Patton before his death in 2017.

Faith No More's third album, and debut with Patton, The Real Thing was released in 1989. The album reached the top 20 on the US charts, thanks largely to MTV's heavy rotation of the "Epic" music video, (which features Patton in a Mr. Bungle T-shirt). Faith No More released three more studio albums—Angel Dust (1992), King for a Day... Fool for a Lifetime (1995), and Album of the Year (1997)—before disbanding in 1998. In one interview, Patton cited what he perceived as the declining quality of the band's work as a contributing factor to the split.

On February 24, 2009, after months of speculation, Faith No More announced they would be reforming with a line-up identical to the Album of the Year era, embarking on a reunion tour called The Second Coming Tour. To coincide with the band's reunion tour, Rhino released the sixth Faith No More compilation, The Very Best Definitive Ultimate Greatest Hits Collection in the UK on June 8. The same line-up eventually released a new album called Sol Invictus in 2015, and following its supporting tour, Faith No More entered another hiatus. In 2019, the band announced that they were reuniting for a tour of the UK and the Europe in 2020, which was postponed to 2021–2022 due to the COVID-19 pandemic and eventually cancelled with Patton citing mental health reasons, and Faith No More had since resumed their hiatus. The band announced its third reunion in June 2026.

=== Solo work and band projects: 1984–present ===
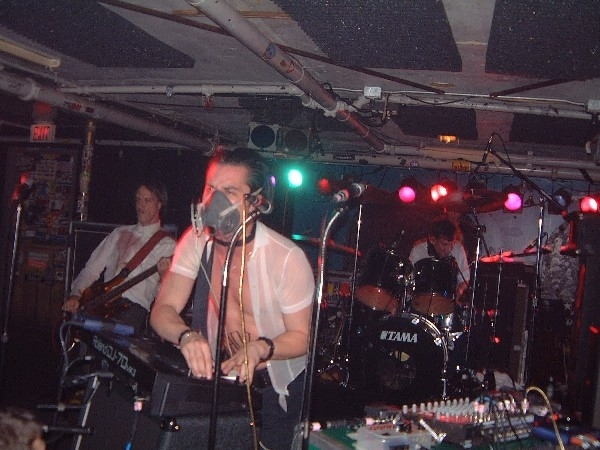
Patton performing with an elastomeric respirator (without filter cartridges attached) during a Tomahawk show in 2002

During his time in Faith No More, Patton continued to work with Mr. Bungle. His success in mainstream rock and metal ultimately helped secure Mr. Bungle a record deal with Warner Bros. The band released a self-titled album (produced by John Zorn) in 1991, and the experimental Disco Volante in 1995. Their final album, California, was released in 1999. The band ceased being active following the 1999–2000 tour in support of the California record, although their disbandment was only officially confirmed in November 2004. Mr. Bungle reunited in 2019 with three original members (Patton, Dunn and Spruance) plus drummer Dave Lombardo and guitarist Scott Ian to re-record its first demo from 1986 The Raging Wrath of the Easter Bunny; the album was released on October 30, 2020.

Patton's other projects included two solo albums on the Composer Series of John Zorn's Tzadik label, (Adult Themes for Voice in 1996 and Pranzo Oltranzista in 1997). He is a member of Hemophiliac, in which he performs vocal effects along with John Zorn on saxophone and Ikue Mori on laptop electronics. This group is billed as "improvisational music from the outer reaches of madness". He has also guested on Painkiller and Naked City recordings. He has appeared on other Tzadik releases with Zorn and others, notably as part of the "Moonchild Trio" alongside Joey Baron and Trevor Dunn, named after Zorn's 2006 album on which the trio first appeared, Moonchild: Songs Without Words.

In 1998, Patton formed the metal supergroup Fantômas with guitarist Buzz Osborne (of The Melvins), bassist Trevor Dunn (of Mr. Bungle), and drummer Dave Lombardo (of Slayer). They have released four studio albums. In 1999, Patton collaborated with Japanese experimental musician Merzbow on the album She, released under the name Maldoror.

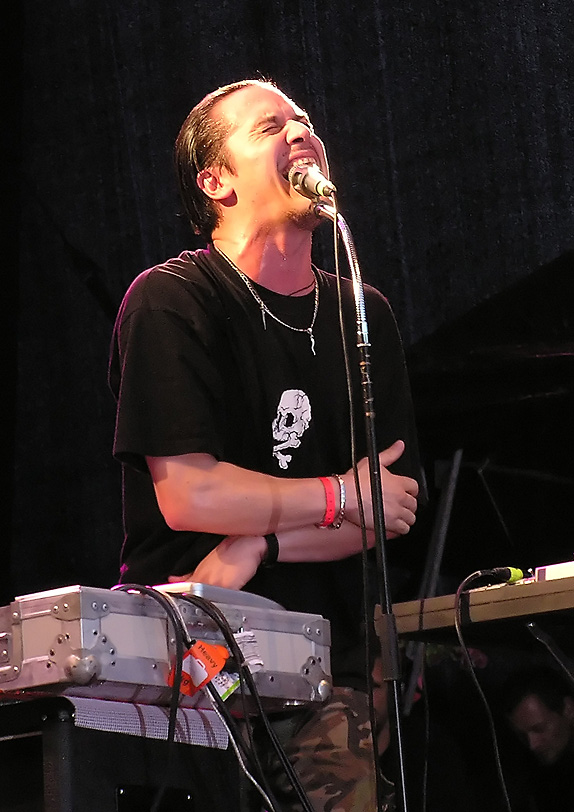
Patton playing with Fantômas in 2005

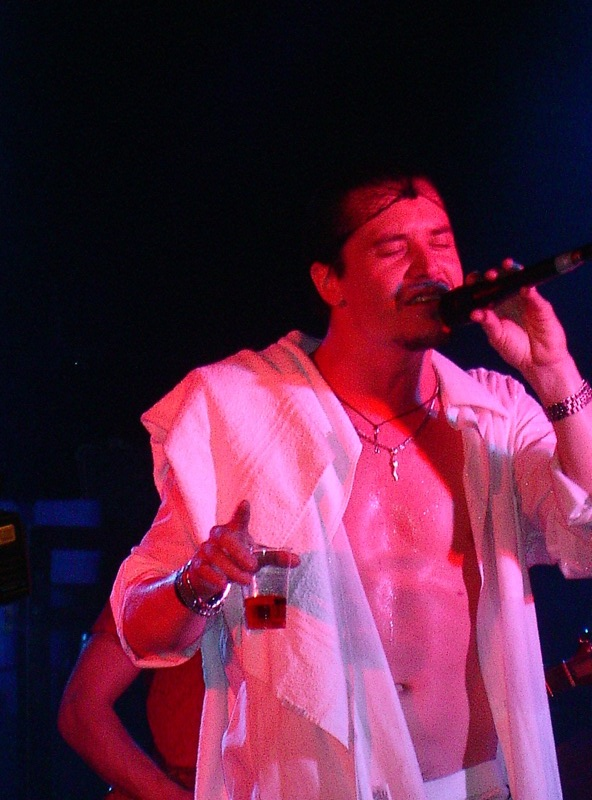
Patton in Milan, Italy, as part of Peeping Tom, 2006

In 1999, Patton met former The Jesus Lizard guitarist Duane Denison at a Mr. Bungle concert in Nashville, and the two subsequently formed the band Tomahawk. Tomahawk's straightforward rock sound has often been compared to Album of the Year/King for a Day era Faith No More.

In 2001, he contributed vocals to Chino Moreno's group Team Sleep and released the album Music to Make Love to Your Old Lady By with the group Lovage, a collaborative project consisting of Patton, Dan the Automator, Jennifer Charles, and Kid Koala.

Patton performed vocals for Dillinger Escape Plan's 2002 EP, Irony Is a Dead Scene. That year, he joined violinist Eyvind Kang and his ensemble Playground to play the piece Virginal Co Ordinates at the AngelicA International Festival of Music in Bologna. The performance would be released as an album in 2003.

In 2004, Patton worked with Björk and the beat boxer Rahzel on the album Medúlla. That same year, Patton released the album Romances with Kaada and contributed vocals to the album White People by Handsome Boy Modeling School (Dan the Automator and Prince Paul). In 2005, Patton collaborated with hip-hop DJ trio and turntablists The X-Ecutioners to release the album General Patton vs. The X-Ecutioners.

In February 2006, Mike Patton performed an operatic piece composed by Eyvind Kang, based on the 1582 work Cantus Circaeus by Giordano Bruno, at Teatro Comunale di Modena in Modena, Italy. Patton sang alongside vocalist Jessika Kenney, and was accompanied by the Modern Brass Ensemble, Bologna Chamber Choir, and Alberto Capelli and Walter Zanetti on electric and acoustic guitars. The singer remarked that it was extremely challenging to project the voice without a microphone. This performance was later released as the record Athlantis in July 2007, through Ipecac Recordings.

Patton's Peeping Tom album was released on May 30, 2006, on his own Ipecac label. The set was pieced together by swapping song files through the mail with collaborators like Dan the Automator, Rahzel, Norah Jones, Kool Keith, Massive Attack, Odd Nosdam, Amon Tobin, Jel, Doseone, Bebel Gilberto, Kid Koala, and Dub Trio.

In 2008, he performed vocals on the track "Lost Weekend" by The Qemists. In December 2008, along with Melvins, Patton co-curated an edition of the All Tomorrow's Parties Nightmare Before Christmas festival. Patton chose half of the lineup and performed the album The Director's Cut in its entirety with Fantômas. Patton also appeared as Rikki Kixx in the Adult Swim show Metalocalypse in a special 2 part episode on August 24.

In June 2009, Mike Patton and Fred Frith performed in Queen Elizabeth Hall, London, England as part of that year's Meltdown Festival.

On May 4, 2010, Mondo Cane, where Patton worked live with a 30-piece orchestra, was released by Ipecac Recordings. The album was co-produced and arranged by Daniele Luppi. Recorded in 2007 at a series of European performances including an outdoor concert in a Northern Italian piazza, the CD features traditional Italian pop songs of the 1950s and 1960s as well as a rendition of Ennio Morricone's "Deep Down".

On June 18, 2010, Patton performed the 1965 work Laborintus II by classical composer Luciano Berio in Amsterdam, along with the orchestra Ictus Ensemble and vocal group Nederlands Kamerkoor. This show would be released as an album on July 10, 2012. On October 8, 2016, Patton and Ictus Ensemble played this piece in Krakow, Poland, preceded by a performance of the album Virginal Co Ordinates the previous day, alongside its creator Eyvind Kang.

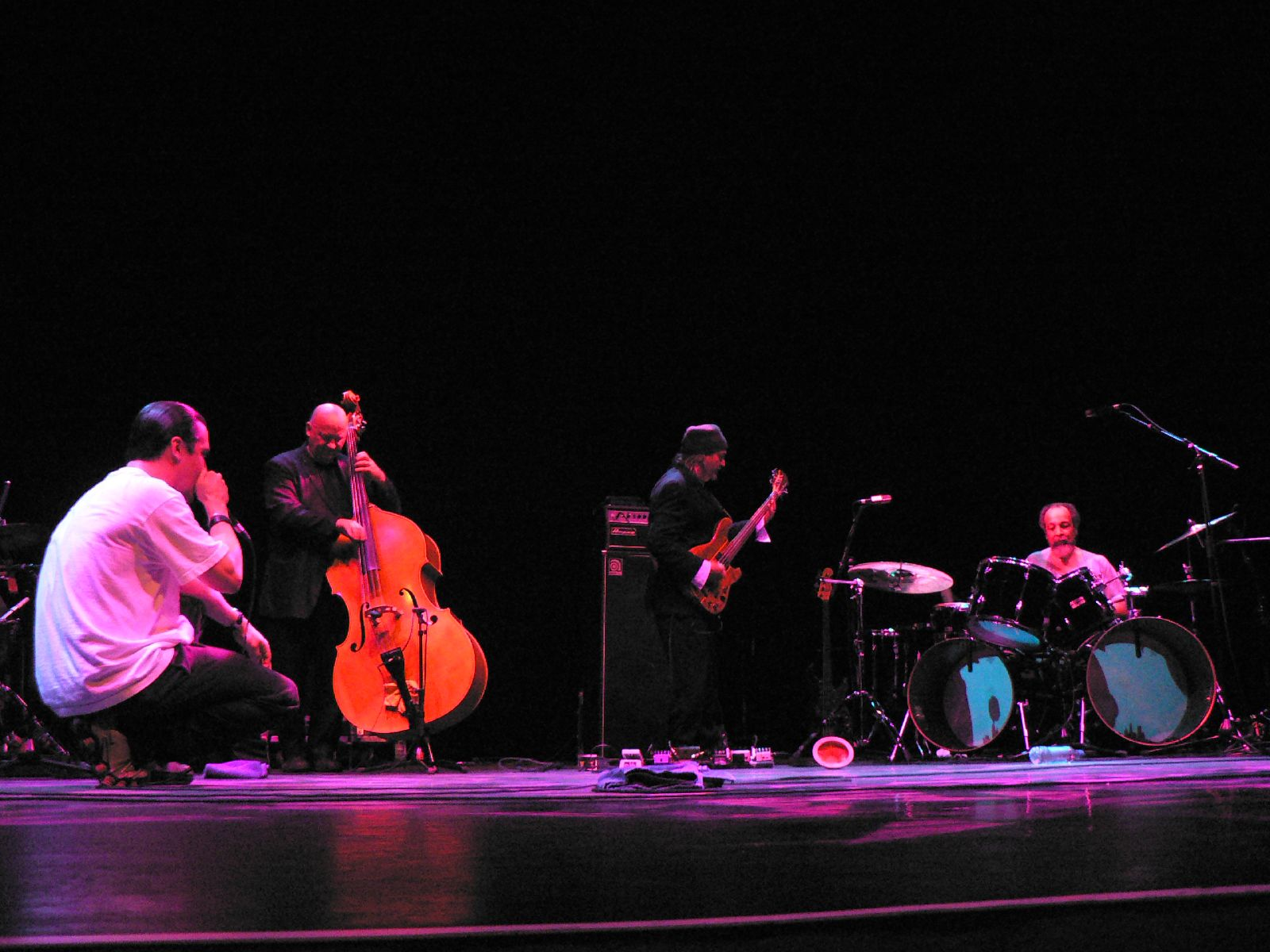
Patton (left) with Gavin Bryars, Bill Laswell and Milford Graves in a 2006 tribute to guitarist Derek Bailey

Patton is a member of the supergroup Nevermen, alongside Tunde Adebimpe of TV on the Radio and rapper Doseone (with whom Patton had previously collaborated on the Peeping Tom side project). In 2016, the group released an eponymous debut album on Patton's Ipecac label.

In August 2017, Patton released an album with the band Dead Cross, a supergroup that includes Slayer and Fantômas drummer Dave Lombardo and Retox members Michael Crain and Justin Pearson.

On December 27, 2017, Patton performed his collaborative EP, Irony Is a Dead Scene, as well as a cover of Faith No More's "Malpractice," with the Dillinger Escape Plan live at the band's first of three final shows at Terminal 5 in New York City.

In May 2018, Patton performed two concerts entitled Forgotten Songs in Modena, Italy, with the American pianist Uri Caine. The setlists of the concerts varied and included songs from Olivier Messiaen, Elton John, Slayer, Violeta Parra, George Gurdjieff, and many others. They also performed a new song called "Chansons D'amour" from an album Patton would later release with French musician Jean-Claude Vannier, Corpse Flower of September 2019. The shows were recorded, but it is not certain if the material will get a release.

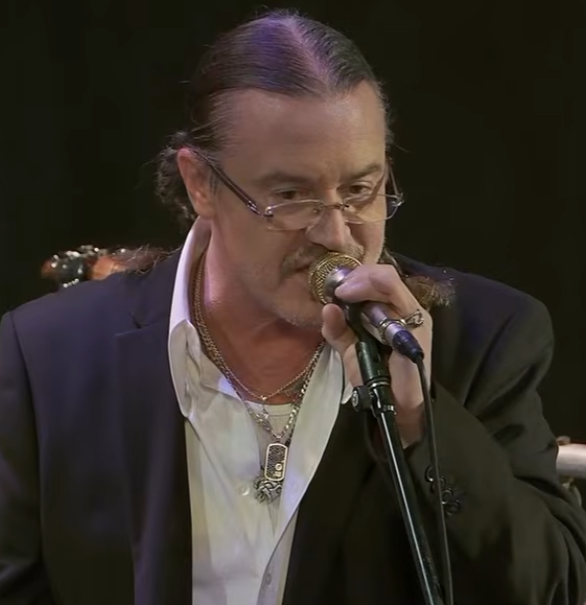
Mike Patton performing with The Avett Brothers at the GRAMMY Museum on November 11, 2025.

On January 25, 2020, Patton joined Laurie Anderson and Rubin Kodheli at the SFJAZZ Center for a performance based on the 16th century military manual Quanjing Jieyao Pian by Qi Jiguang.

In September 2021, Faith No More was scheduled to play shows. However, the dates were cancelled due to Patton citing mental health reasons.

On September 16, 2025, after teasers on the respective artist's social media, Mike Patton and The Avett Brothers announced their collaborative project AVTT/PTTN, which would release on November 14th, 2025 via Thirty Tigers in association with Ramseur Records and Ipepac Recordings. Subsequently they announced tour dates for 2026 and appeared on The Tonight Show Starring Jimmy Fallon and CBS Mornings to promote the collaboration.

== Other ventures ==
=== Film work ===
In 2005, Patton signed on to compose the soundtrack for the independent movie Pinion, marking his debut scoring an American feature-length film. However, this had been held up in production and may be on the shelf permanently. His other film work includes portraying two major characters in the Steve Balderson film Firecracker.

Patton provided the voices of the monsters in the 2007 film I Am Legend starring Will Smith.

He also worked on the Derrick Scocchera short film "A Perfect Place" for the score/soundtrack, which is longer than the film itself.

In 2009, Patton created the soundtrack to the movie Crank: High Voltage.

In the 2010 film Bunraku Patton voiced The Narrator.

Patton composed the soundtrack to the 2012 film The Place Beyond the Pines.

In 2016, Patton provided the voice to lead character Eddy Table in a short animated film, The Absence of Eddy Table.

In 2017, he scored the Stephen King movie 1922 for Netflix.

=== Video game work ===
Patton is an avid video game player, especially with PlayStation consoles. In 2007, he provided the voice of the eponymous force in the video game The Darkness, working alongside Kirk Acevedo, Lauren Ambrose and Dwight Schultz. Patton reprised the role in The Darkness II in 2012.

He also had a role in Valve's 2007 release Portal as the voice of the Anger Sphere in the final confrontation with the insane supercomputer, GLaDOS. He has another role in the Valve title Left 4 Dead, voicing the majority of the infected zombies. He also voiced Nathan "Rad" Spencer, the main character in Capcom's 2009 video game Bionic Commando, a sequel to their classic NES title.

On March 11, 2021, Patton lent his voice to a remake of the 1987 Teenage Mutant Ninja Turtles theme song that was released as the trailer for the video game Teenage Mutant Ninja Turtles: Shredder's Revenge.

== Artistry ==
=== Voice, techniques and style ===
I'm not a poet. I'm not up onstage to get something off my chest. I'm making musical statements, or, most of the time, musical questions for people to figure out, and I'm not going to get in the way of that.

— Mike Patton on his music, 2013

Throughout his career, Patton has utilized various different genres including, avant-garde, alternative metal, experimental, experimental rock, art pop, contemporary classical, funk metal, and thrash metal. Mike Patton's vocals touch on crooning, falsetto, screaming, opera, death growls, rapping, beatboxing, and scatting, among other techniques. While already a proficient singer, Patton is fond of manipulating his voice with effect pedals and diverse tools. This has been a prominent feature in his project Fantômas and contemporary classical performers. Critic Greg Prato writes, "Patton could very well be one of the most versatile and talented singers in rock music"; colleague Blake Butler called Patton "a complete and utter musical visionary and a mind-blowing and standard-warping genius." He has knowledge on multiple instruments as well.

Patton has garnered media attention for his wide vocal range, but when asked about his range in a 2019 interview, he said of past articles written about his vocal range: "I think that range thing is all bullshit. I don't think that I have the biggest range. And even if I do, who cares! ... This is not like the Olympics of vocals. [laughs] I could make a record without singing a note, and I'll be happy with it."

Patton is enthusiastic about collaborating with other musicians, stating that "It is really what makes life interesting", but he only participates in projects he feels close to.

Phil Freeman of The Wire groups Patton with Tom Waits, Frank Zappa and Brian Wilson in what he calls 'California Pop Art' – artists from that area who adapted unconventional sources into their music and created pieces to then hire musicians capable of realizing them. Several writers have likened Patton to Zappa (as well as their bands Mr. Bungle and Mothers of Invention) because of the quantity of their work, wide-ranging influences and recurrent use of humor. Patton is averse to that comparison, but he admitted that one of the few records he enjoyed from his parents' collection was from Zappa. Freeman believes that besides superficial elements, their music does not hold many similarities.

Film scores by Patton have been described as blurring the lines between genres, as well as "radical", in a manner similar to popular musicians such as Trent Reznor and Atticus Ross who turned to the audiovisual medium without any strict adherence to its orchestral tradition. On his method of composition for other musicians' pieces and filmmakers, Patton said that the most important quality is to remain flexible and open to any style, as well as to always follow the vision of the author.

=== Vocal writing and lyrics ===
[Patton's] ear is so finely tuned – [he is aware of] every single little thing [in the band], and nothing, nothing gets by him! ... And if [some members] fuck up one little thing, he's like, "Stop! ... There was one little thing here; do this, try this." And it's never mean, or yelling, or condescending, it's just in a creative musical way always. ... He's like Stevie Wonder, guys that just could play everything that's going on in a room, and they know everything. ... [The creative process] is so pure with him.

— Scott Ian about working with Patton, 2020

Patton bases his vocals on what "the music dictates", whether that is using his voice in a traditional way or as "another [instrument]." Both with orchestras and smaller bands, the singer follows a serial, painstaking approach on his writing. Although he has performed with many improvisation and game ensembles through his career, Patton rarely composes vocals through jam sessions. His compositions are preceded by the study of the instrumentals, where he analyzes every instrument and their specific parts, and afterward focuses on "blending [his voice] into the band" rather than being at the forefront of the pieces. Patton feels that the best recordings have the vocals "a little buried in the mix" as they interact with the other instruments. Usually, his first composition step is to find the lead melody of a piece, either vocal or otherwise, imagining notes and sounds on top of it. After that his writing naturally progresses, e.g. by employing a "third or fourth [harmony]" or "whatever [else] needs to be done". In 2019, Patton noted: "Making great music is sometimes like being in a torture chamber. You have to accept the pain. Ultimately, it's not about you. It's about how the music can be best served." Patton is inclined to produce dense overdubs that include numerous vocals or instrumentations in single passages. When asked about the unorthodox use of his voice – drawing on diverse techniques and effects, or eschewing lyrics, Patton remarked: "The voice is an instrument. No rules, just part of the music."

Former bandmate William Winant singled out Patton's immediacy to concretize musical ideas he has in his head. Faith No More bassist Billy Gould observed his reaction to the backbone of the songs from The Real Thing and concluded: "[Patton] was trying to figure us out at first, ... But he has this key to understanding music on a real gut level, and his ideas honestly made these songs even better."

Patton creates lyrics after hearing the instrumentals and, in the same way as the vocals, he approaches them depending on "what the music needs". His songwriting takes a phonetic perspective instead of a literal one, making sounds paramount – "the music tells the story", he says. As soon as he creates the melodies, he generally seeks words that sound the most similar to what he heard in his head. On the other hand, when working thematically, Patton says that each song is usually a character sketch acted out by him, "trying to appropriate their [respective] psycholog[ies]", and does not make them autobiographical. Before writing, Patton tends to read books about the specific topic he wants to address and then fits it into "stolen ideas from other musicians." Journalists highlight the marked deromanticization by Patton on his own songwriting (he once compared it to "brushing [his] teeth"), yet, in the 1990s, he either said or hinted that at least a few songs came from his personal experiences. Regardless of the extent to which Patton's statements on his lyrics are accurate, to Cammila Albertson at AllMusic his self-deprecating attitude is "self-aware" and, at least partly, a reaction to the self-importance of people in the music industry, manifested more clearly in his parody of rock and rap clichés in the lyrics of "Mojo" by Peeping Tom. In a 1993 Faith No More interview, Patton elaborated:

I wanna be myself, not say what I am. ... I guess the idea is that, as a singer, you're supposed to inherit a lot of responsibilities, but I never thought of myself as that important. None of us are that type of artist. When I see a picture of myself, I don't get a hard-on.

In some projects such as much of Moonchild Trio and Fantômas, he has avoided lyrics completely in favor of preverbal sounds, because, in these cases, he deems language "distracting information". Although many of these verses do not have concrete meanings, Patton emphasizes that they are not emotionally void, in the same way as neither a painting without explanatory notes is. For him, records are akin to an "adventure" or scenes from a movie, and he enjoys that people interpret them in their own way, corresponding to how he himself listens to other music. Patton's free-form approach, both vocally and lyrically, mirrors those of singers Demetrio Stratos and The Boredoms' Yamantaka Eye.

His early songs in Mr. Bungle dealt with "real nasty, offensive stuff". By the time of 1989's The Real Thing, Patton was studying English literature in college whereas Faith No More was an already established band, circumstances that led him to write its lyrics as if they were a "school project".

=== Music development ===
As a young child, Patton had an aptitude for the recognition of different sounds. According to Patton, his parents became aware that he imitated bird vocalizations. This prompted them to give him a flexi disc of vocal exercises, "like guys that could make odd sounds", which became one of his favorite records but without understanding its purpose at the time. He realized the potential of his voice at the age of eight or nine by doing "things to get attention" at school.

Mike Patton is mostly a self-taught musician and cannot read or write notation. He has perfect pitch. His production methods also grew from him figuring out how to accomplish the sounds he tried to convey every time he was in his studio. In the beginning, Patton mimicked and drew from all the singers whose music he admired. Only once Patton started to continually record himself and listened to these recordings, he was able to establish a foundation to shape his skills. Thereby, he points up that "hearing more", both to his and other music, has been his most important education. Since he began to improvise with saxophonist John Zorn in 1991, along with his discoveries of Demetrio Stratos and Diamanda Galás, Patton started broad explorations into extended vocal techniques and the limits of his voice, with him trying to match Zorn's "immense, bullheaded" range. Many of his vocal deeds and exercises arisen from improvisations were documented on the 1996 album Adult Themes For Voice. Around the period that Patton moved to Italy, he became acquainted with the singing method of opera teacher Nicola Vaccai, which he studied autodidactically for years, furthering his repertoire more. At the time he also delved into Bel canto, a florid Italian singing tradition, as can be seen in his operatic performances and also in Mondo Cane.

People are too concerned with theoretical knowledge. I think the important thing is to hear more.

— Mike Patton, 2015

Patton's views on creating music are somewhat similar to those of Brian Eno, a self-professed "non-musician", with the difference that Patton excelled at his main instrument and mastered at least the rudiments of several others. Although Patton disregards the preponderance of theory in favor of doing, (Note: In an early concert by Tomahawk in Boston, Massachusetts, Patton poked fun at the students from the local Berklee College of Music, which he called "Berklee College of Waste Your Money and Music" and other things. That performance was attended by Eric Andre, who studied there at the time but ultimately became a comedian, who later said that Patton led him to question his decision.) he still attributes part of his development to working with learned musicians: when Mr. Bungle formed in 1984, he was "fascinated" with his friends Trey Spruance and Trevor Dunn, both theory and jazz students at school, because they knew more about music than him, and decided to "follow their lead." Afterward, at Humboldt State University, his bandmates Dunn, Spruance, Danny Heifetz and Clinton McKinnon were all majoring in music while Patton studied English literature. Spruance highlights the great music resources in Humboldt's library, where he spent a lot of time studying, and the band rehearsed at the same place as the college big band, in which the four of them played. Additionally, Patton—along with Heifetz—was tutored on percussion by professor Eugene Novotney.

Composer and saxophonist John Zorn, who met Patton in 1990, is credited with teaching him "many things", such as vocal improvisation when performing with an ensemble. In 2006, Patton spoke about their relationship: "I've been incredibly fortunate to have a friend like that — who is also a peer and a mentor". Some of his recording sessions with Zorn as conductor were so arduous that the singer passed out.

=== Influences ===
I love music. Why limit yourself?

— Mike Patton, 2004

With regards to his influences, Patton stated: "You should be able to draw inspiration from any and everything. There should be no limits, it's fundamental. A lot of people listen to music that I make and [do not understand why my songs are so eclectic. But] that's the way I listen to music! ... That's the way I see the world and that's how it comes out of me. ... The deeper that well [of inspiration] is and the more places you can find it, the better." Detailing his composition process, Patton once paraphrased the T. S. Eliot quote, "Good artists copy; great artists steal."

==== Early influences ====
Patton's first bands in high school played heavy metal; by the start of Mr. Bungle, the frontman was immersed in death metal and hardcore punk. In this period, his favorites groups included Venom, Possessed and Sodom. In terms of punk, he was a big fan of The Exploited and straight edge band 7 Seconds. The band's second and third demos shifted its sound to ska and funk, and the last one of 1989 incorporated a wide variety of genres. Patton considers his work at a record store as crucial for his and Mr. Bungle's evolution: upon his arrival, he "devour[ed]" extreme metal and punk rock music, while his coworkers introduced him to diverse artists who ranged from rap to reggae to folk rock and other genres.

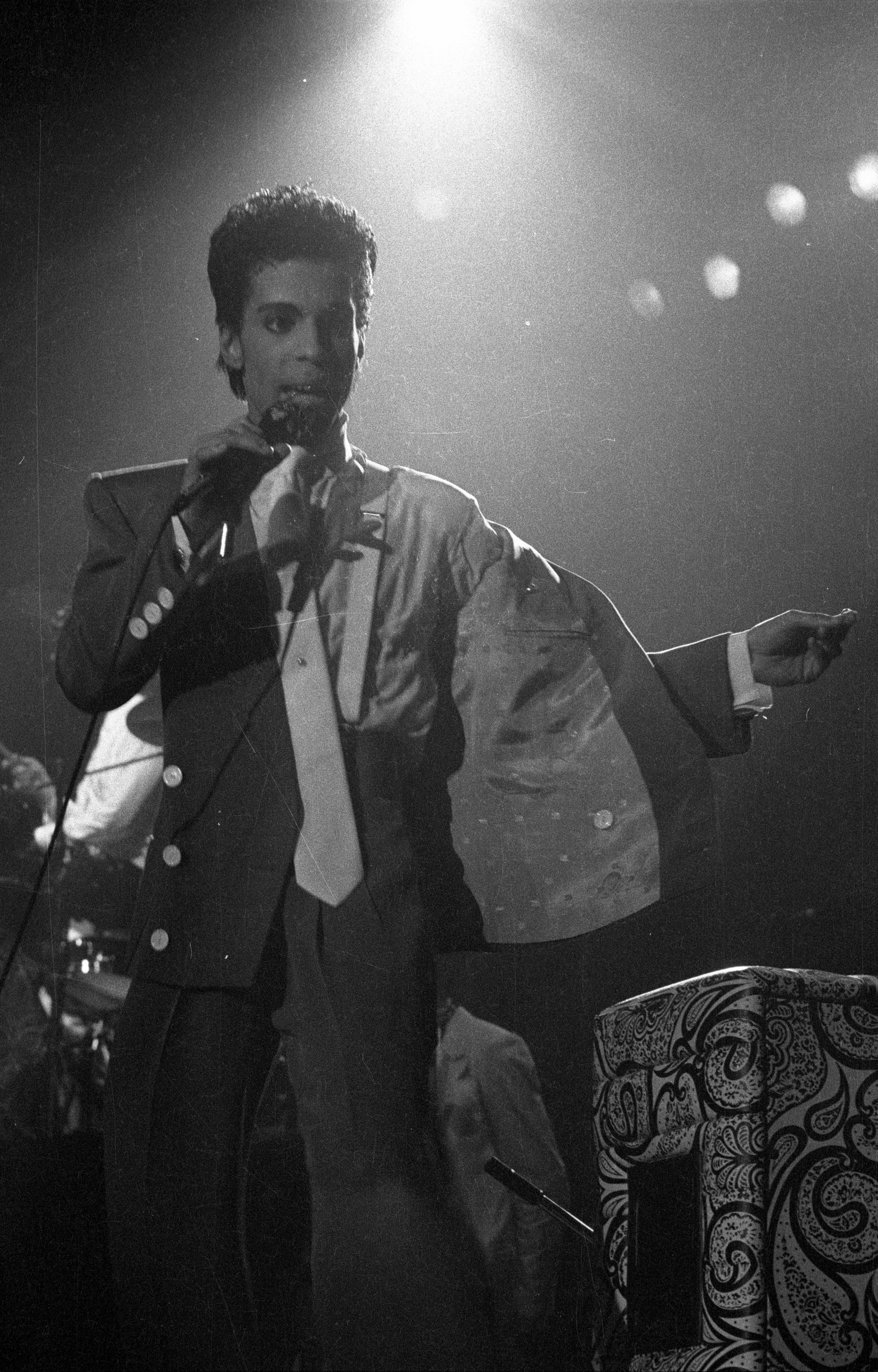
Prince was a major early influence on Patton.

Before the release of their 1986 debut, The Raging Wrath of the Easter Bunny, Dunn and Patton had got hold of ska- and funk-infused bands such as Oingo Boingo, Fishbone, Red Hot Chili Peppers, Camper Van Beethoven, E.U. and others. Spruance said that the catalyst to their progression was their attendance to an October 1986 show by funk rock band Fishbone, as they were one of the few renowned hard rock-fusion groups that played in their hometown of Eureka. (Note: On that show, Fishbone was supported by Eggly Bagelface, the ska group of drummer Danny Heifetz whom Mr. Bungle would later contact to join them in 1988.) These musical findings spurred Mr. Bungle's interest in tearing down the walls between opposite styles, and challenging the seriousness of the extreme metal community. The theatrics and overexpression of certain notes of Oingo Boingo's Danny Elfman paralleled those of Patton, while his late 1980s nasal rapping drew comparisons to Red Hot Chili Peppers' Anthony Kiedis. This period of Mr. Bungle also echoes the lighthearted youthfulness and wacky videos by British ska pop band Madness, whose song "House of Fun" reminisces "Carousel" by Mr. Bungle musically. Perhaps Patton's biggest influence by then had become Prince, evident in the soulful inflections and crafty squeals throughout his first studio albums with both Faith No More and Mr. Bungle. (Note: Mr. Bungle and Faith No More would cover songs by Prince, namely, "Nothing Compares 2 U" and "My Name Is Prince", respectively.) Throughout those years the band still had broad musical interests that included new developments in heavy music, and they constantly traveled to San Francisco in order to attend shows and buy more obscure metal records. Patton also began his connections with easy listening through singer Sammy Davis Jr. Furthermore, he came under the influence of R&B singer Sade on his arrival to Faith No More, reflected in later songs such as "Evidence".

He pinpoints his discoveries of "extraordinary" Motown singers and some records by Frank Zappa as landmarks at his record-store job. After a few years working there, Patton was allowed to commission albums to have them on sale, subsequently ordering "the craziest shit" he was aware of from diverse styles, with the secret intention of taking those records into his house to make copies of them that he and his Mr. Bungle bandmates would listen to. This rapidly expanded their music tastes.

==== Vocal influences ====
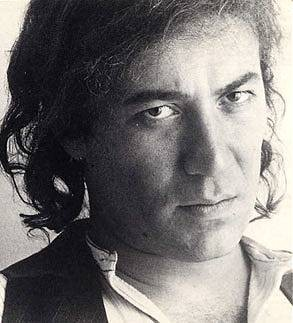
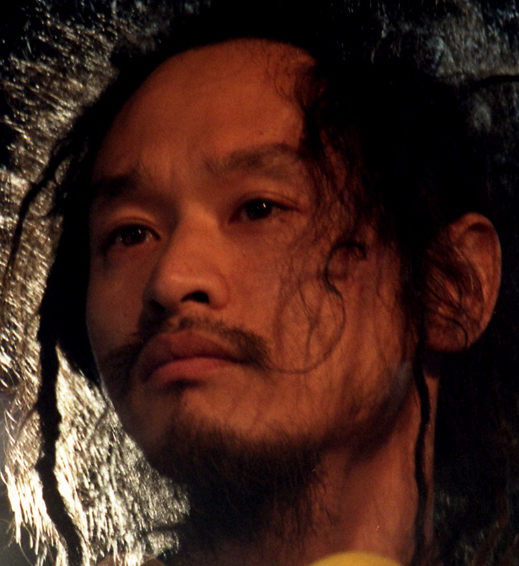
Demetrio Stratos (left) and Yamantaka Eye (right) influenced Patton's extended vocal techniques.

Asked about his influences and favorite singers in 1992, Patton said "A lot of people, I don't even know [where to start]", but among them mentioned Diamanda Galás, Frank Sinatra, Blixa Bargeld from Einstürzende Neubauten, H.R. from the Bad Brains, Chet Baker, Elton John and Obituary's John Tardy. Several reviewers have noted similarities between his most adventurous works and the music of Galás, and the solo performances and screams of Bargeld. The frontman expresses much admiration for Sinatra's musicality, owning rare live records and outtakes from him, and considers unfortunate that the crooner's private life overshadowed his artistry. Some authors observed that Bad Brains' H.R. presaged the dynamic delivery of Patton.

One of Patton's biggest influences was Greek-Italian singer and researcher Demetrio Stratos, leader of Area, who studied the limits of the human range and recorded several vocals-only albums that Patton examined. Stratos died unexpectedly amid his research, aged 34, and years later writer Anthony Heilbut referred to Patton as his "most famous heir". The surreal vocals of Yamantaka Eye from The Boredoms and Hanatarash inspired the lyric-less compositions by the singer as well, and the former had also played with Naked City before Patton.

Another influence is Tom Waits; Angel Dust included the Waits-inspired song "RV", and at that time Patton began to use a megaphone both on stage and in the studio. The 1970s catalog of Stevie Wonder include some of the records that impacted Patton the most vocally, such as The Secret Life of Plants. In different incarnations, he has covered the Stevie Wonder songs "Sir Duke" and "They Won't Go When I Go".

In 2019, he cited the spoken word-esque lyrical style of Leonard Cohen as inspirational, as well as the voice and note placement of Serge Gainsbourg, in addition to the writing of Bob Dylan. Patton disregarded this type of musician when he was younger, until he eventually "hear[d] new things" in them.

==== Other influences ====
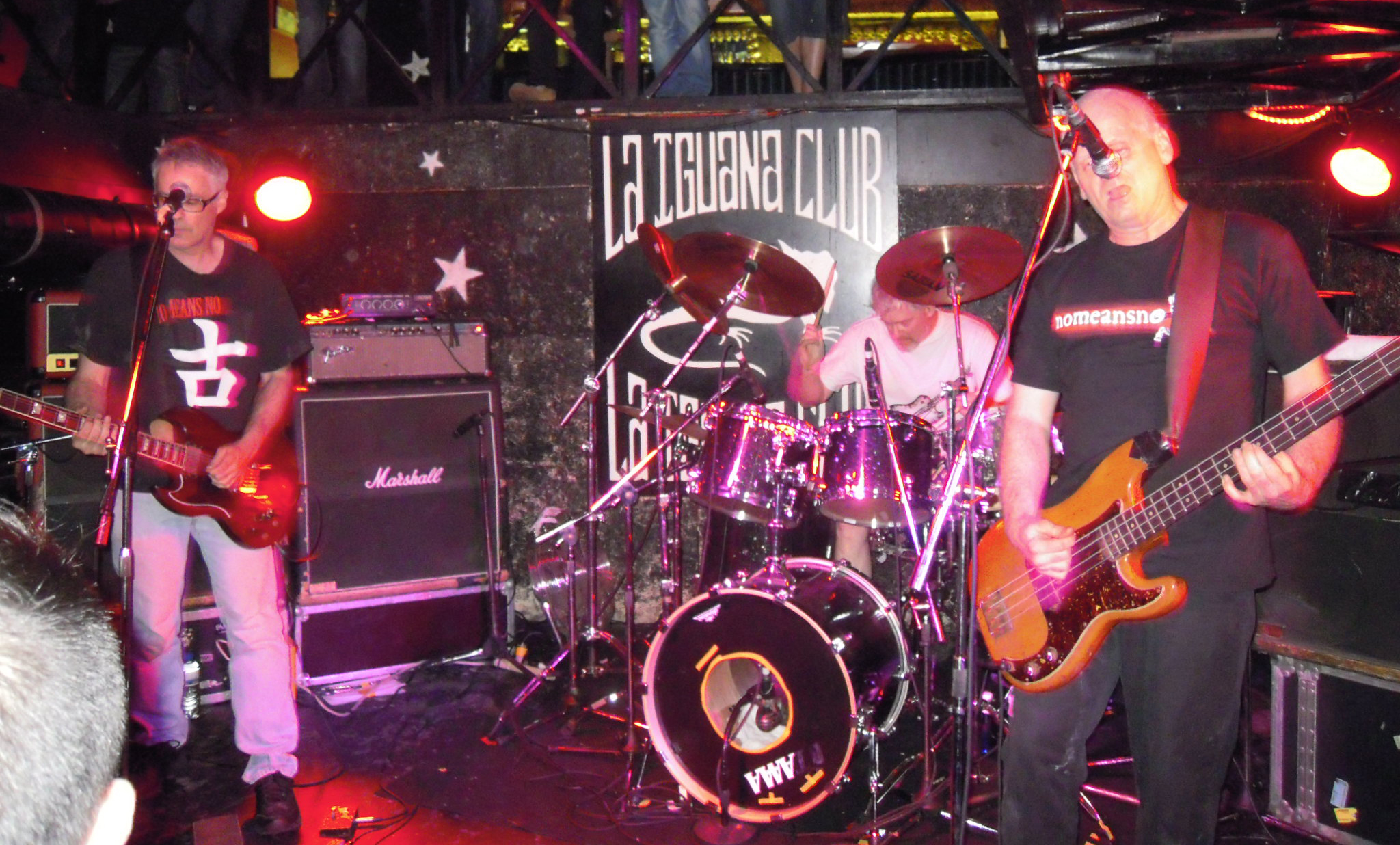
The members of Mr. Bungle often traveled to watch Nomeansno play live.

In 1992, he cited Nomeansno and The Residents as influences. The Quietus pointed out "Patton's love of the Cardiacs, and musical digression" in general as well. Patton held in high regard the Super Roots EP series by Boredoms, along with the albums A Fierce Pancake by Stump, Ozma by Melvins and Drop Dead by Siege. He was a big admirer of industrial metal band Godflesh, and invited the guitarist Justin Broadrick to join Faith No More after the departure of Jim Martin in 1993. The Young Gods informed his and Faith No More's later use of samples.

By 1992, Patton's favorite genre had become easy listening, and years later he named composer and arranger Les Baxter as the main influence on one of his film scores. In 2005, he stated: "The orchestration in that music is so dense and so complex and so amazing, if you can get beyond the kitsch. And I can do that in 30 seconds flat. ... I hear new stuff in there every time I listen." Besides Baxter, orchestral pop composer Burt Bacharach is a major influence on Patton's writing, and he has expressed his desire to work with Bacharach. Additionally, the singer was "besotted" with the music of Jean-Claude Vannier after discovering his arrangements for Serge Gainsbourg, and the two went on to collaborate in 2019.

In 1988, Patton mentioned actor and comedian Steve Martin as an influence on Mr. Bungle, and he later stated that he felt identified with him. He has credited disco band Village People for his use of irony and stage costumes, believing that "a lot of people [did not] understand [the band's deliberate sarcasm]". Mr. Bungle covered "Macho Man" as early as 1985 (its second active year). Another ideological influence was shock rock singer GG Allin, who Patton considered "the musician who never sold out" and admired that "he lived and died for what he believed in".

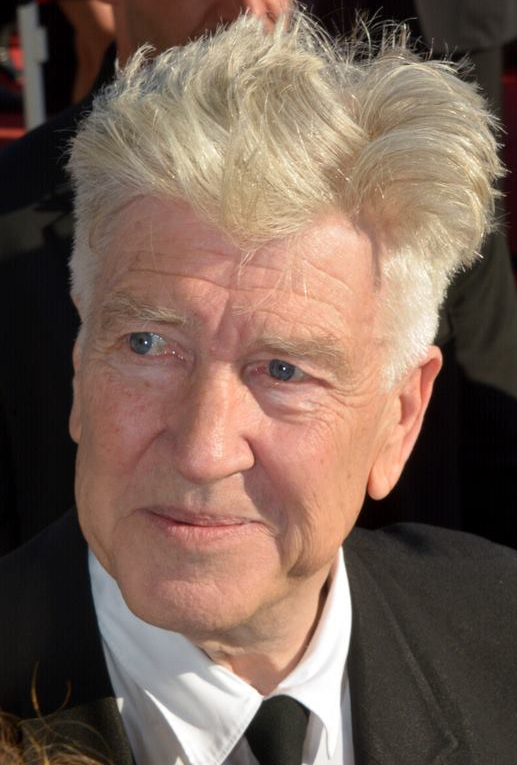
Critics often compare Patton's music to the films of David Lynch, whom the singer reveres.

Films and books have informed Patton more than any other medium. The eclecticism of both Ennio Morricone's scores for Dario Argento, and Jerry Goldsmith, were major sparks for his interest in soundtracks. Patton shows a deep appreciation for movies that deal with inner, psychological uncertainty and distress, rather than outward shock value or glitz. Important film pieces to him include Rosemary's Baby by Krzysztof Komeda, In Like Flint by Jerry Goldsmith, The Godfather by Nino Rota, Kwaidan by Tōru Takemitsu, Under the Skin by Mica Levi, The Birds by Oskar Sala, and The Exorcist. Patton has expressed his admiration for director David Lynch, and many publications describe the surrealism in some of his music, especially in Disco Volante and California by Mr. Bungle, as "the musical equivalent of a David Lynch movie." He is a devotee of Morricone's catalog, lamenting that his bombastic Westerns eclipsed his more experimental or strictly classical oeuvre, and in 2005 he commissioned a compilation of the lesser-known soundtracks by "E Maestro" that was released on Patton's label. Morricone's death in July 2020 "weighed heavily on" the singer.

Other musical influences are experimental hardcore band Melt-Banana, which toured with Mr. Bungle in 1995, post-rock band Sigur Rós, country singer-songwriter Willie Nelson, the recording of vocals by João Gilberto, composer Olivier Messiaen, especially his transcriptions of birdsongs, and cartoon music composer Carl Stalling, who was a shared point of reference with John Zorn, whose PhD thesis was on him. The singer expressed fondness for Mauricio Kagel's "negation of opera and the whole tradition of music theater", and Mark Mothersbaugh's music in the Crash Bandicoot game series.

Patton has a fascination for the underground scene in Japan, as suggested in the influence of the Boredoms and Melt-Banana on his music, his collaborations with Merzbow and Otomo Yoshihide, and the Ipecac signings of zeuhl band Ruins and ambient duo Yoshimi & Yuka. In 2006, Patton remarked: "Japanese musicians seem less worried about the way things should sound and look. That involves more creative freedom. They are unique."

=== Live performances ===
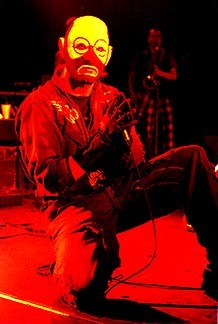
Patton wearing a mechanic's jumpsuit and a clown mask with Mr. Bungle in 1991

Reviewing Patton's live performances, The Believer noted that "his gestures are as anarchic as his vocal sounds", while Revolver highlighted his "maniacal and dapper stage presence". As a rock frontman, Patton regularly communicates with his audiences, often through dry humor and sarcasm.

When he joined Faith No More, Patton was "wound up tight" about matching his performances with the band's attitude. The singer began, among many other things, to front flip onto the stage and land on the floor, to somersault into the crowds, as well as into Bordin's drum kit, or to eat objects such as microphone windscreens. Patton would develop shin splints because of his repeated jumps.

In London, on March 10, 2002, during the first live performance of Tomahawk, Patton started the show by appearing to urinate onto a security guard and photographers, much to the dismay of the press. However, a few days later the band's website said that it was actually a prank dildo that sprayed water.

During Faith No More's concert at the 2009 Sziget Festival in Budapest, Hungary, Patton swallowed a shoelace from a shoe thrown at the stage, before loudly regurgitating it and throwing it back to the public.

== Public image ==
Fame is like going to Las Vegas. And if you can't laugh first and foremost at yourself, then you are fucked. And when you are going through that, it's hilarious.

— Mike Patton, 2002

Labelled as an "icon of the alt-metal world", and a "reluctant pin-up boy", Patton reacted strangely to his fame. According to a 2002 article from East Bay Express: "[Mike Patton]'s undeniably striking, with piercing Italian good looks and that inexplicable aura shared by first crushes, high-profile criminals, and celebrities ... And he's definitely, well, a little weird." The newspaper singled out his "straight-up devilish grin" and opined that Patton "seems to always be wrestling with some sort of suppressed Guido" through his different fashion styles through the years. In 2003, The Age noted he has a "jittery, high-pitched lilt" when interviewed, deemed him "opinionated" as well as prone to swearing and laughing heartily. Writer D.B. Fishman compared his career and image with those of actor and author Crispin Glover.

Mr. Bungle, Patton's band before his sudden rise to fame, already acted bizarrely in the late 1980s; they self-identified as "Star Wars action figure porno freaks" and would throw out bras and underwear for their audience, among other antics. In interviews with Faith No More from the early to mid-1990s, he went on to claim to be obsessed with masturbation; to have defecated in an orange juice carton of Axl Rose and in a hotel hair dryer; to have munched on a tampon left on stage by a member of L7; and to have lived with an aggressive lizard which inspired his lyrics, among many other things. While Faith No More toured at that time, Patton began to carry a voodoo doll named Toodles, sadomasochistic gear, picture books of embalmed corpses and a pickled fetus in a jar. During conversations with reporters, he only showed interest in discussing his "various obsessions" and barely referred to his music. At the San Francisco New Year's Day show with Mr. Bungle in 1991, Patton gave himself an enema and expelled it over the crowd. In July of that year Patton was recorded eating garbage thrown from the crowd in Lisbon, Portugal. On a January 1993 tour in France where a journalist accompanied Faith No More, Patton urinated into his shoe on stage before drinking it, and a few days later he percolated cups of coffee live for the audience. In a 1995 Faith No More show in Santiago de Chile, he kneeled before the audience, mouth open, to receive spits from the crowd while they performed "Midlife Crisis". In 2001, the official website of progressive rock band Tool stated that, when Fantômas supported them in promotion of their Lateralus record, Patton was stopped in Florida by airport security for carrying an extremely large amount of money. In the aftermath, the singer claimed that he carried it to buy an "antique book" there, but could not disclose its name.

The North Coast Journal retrospectively pointed out the "profound lack of fact checking" by some journalists on Patton's statements, and Culture Creature stated that it was hard to determine when he was teasing interviewers. In a 2002 interview, answering the question of which aspects of his claims and public behavior were authentic, the frontman replied: "The more misconceptions, the better". Around ten years after the release of "Epic", the singer was approached to participate in an episode of the documentary series Where Are They Now? on VH1, to which Patton would only agree to do if they had depicted him as a real homeless person living in a cardboard box. East Bay Express commented:

Patton is a genuine rarity: someone who started at the top [with The Real Thing in 1989] and willingly worked his way down [through his artistic and public endeavors following it.] ... Patton's conviction [is] that the only thing in life that should be taken seriously is music ... He was an anti-rock-star rock star who, instead of blowing his head off like Kurt Cobain, just mocked the absurdity of it all.

In the latter part of the 2000s, Patton stopped continually acting irreverently offstage and claiming strange things to interviewers; by the last years of the next decade he had entirely ceased to do so. In 2019, he explained: "I'm already giving a thousand percent to the music ... and I realize what's important and what's not. ... There's an art to [talking to the press] ... And [on the other hand] fucking with [it] and being a dick it's not really worth it. ... and I learned that from an early age, ... there was a while when I was a total asshole and I didn't say anything and all I would do was give you a sarcastic answer, and spread out crazy lies and rumors just because it was funny [laughs] ... [but] I grew up ... And I think, I hope I've gotten a little better at that". The frontman concluded: "It's much easier to just be, what did I say to you before: the easiest thing in the world is just to be yourself."

=== Criticisms and views on music ===
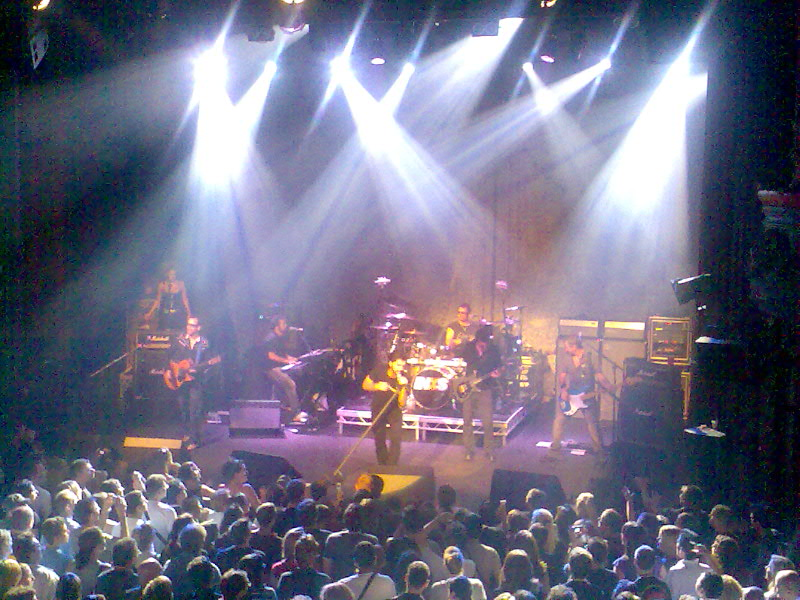
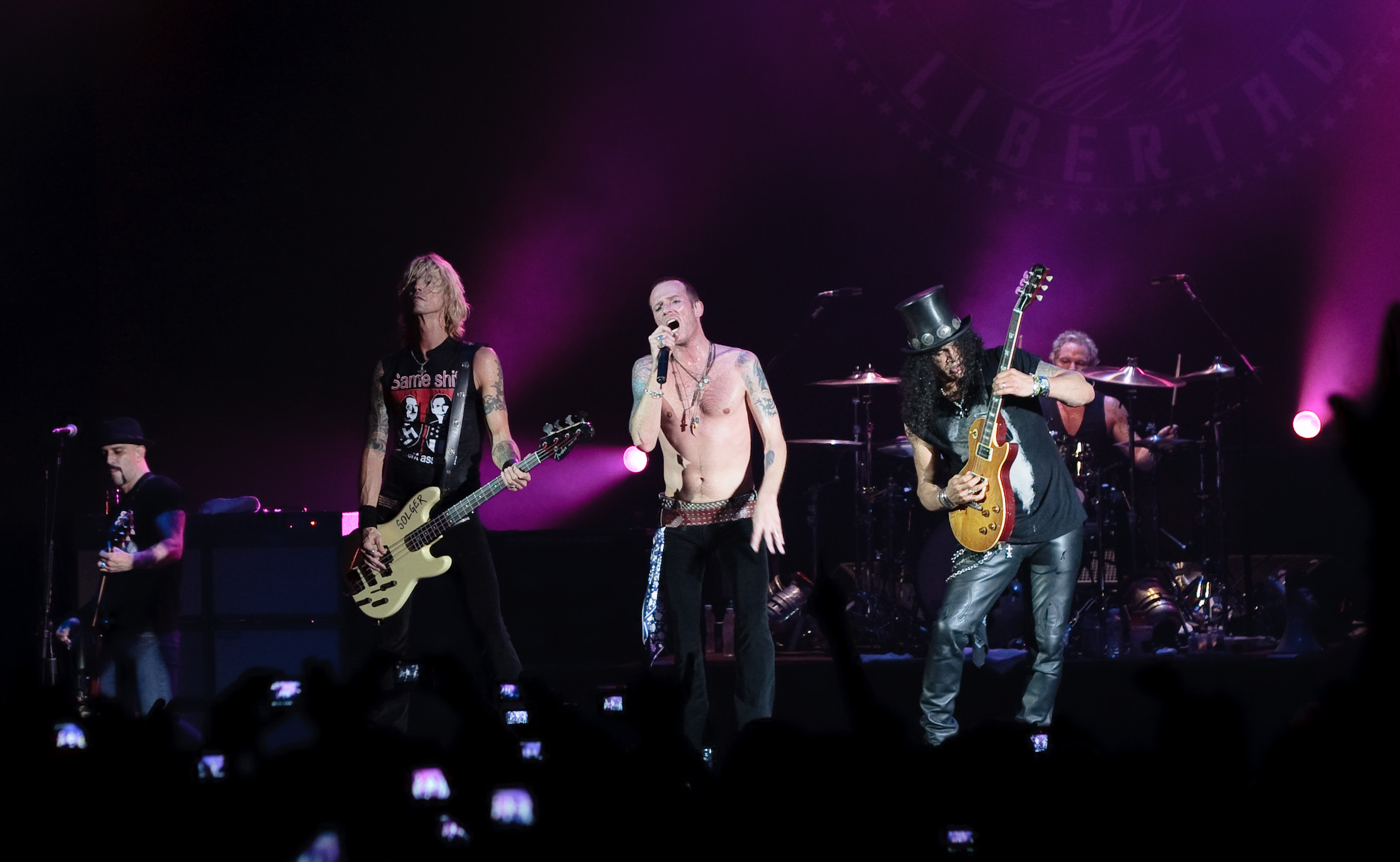
Patton declined offers to join chart-topping bands INXS (top) and Velvet Revolver (bottom) in order to work with experimental, underground artists.

Classic Rock magazine notes the "antihero demeanor" of Patton: the singer regularly makes acerbic criticisms and mockeries of music, but they always seem rooted in his own obsession with it. Patton dislikes the banality and close-mindedness of rock music, in particular the "condescending" attitude of its performers who tend to follow similar formulas, repeat setlists, (Note: On tours with avant-garde grindcore band Fantômas, Patton changed their setlists each night, approach that proved demanding for his bandmates because of the pieces' complexity. They quipped that it took them an hour to learn one minute of music. Similarly, Mr. Bungle changed their setlists each day and also gradually rearranged and modified their songs to the extent that they became almost unrecognizable on their last tour dates.) play crowdpleasers, and not improvise. "[They treat] the audience like children. I think that's ridiculous", he said. "The crux of what you're doing is to open someone's eyes and poke them with something – make them think. ... art should provoke you in some way". In order to achieve this, Patton has sometimes performed deliberately transgressive or shocking acts, both on stage and off. (Note: One of those instances happened in April 1992, after Mr. Bungle invited Melvins, who had just released their drone doom record Lysol, to play a show together in Anaheim, California, because they were big fans of them, but the audience booed the Melvins to the degree that they could not hear their instruments, in what frontman Buzz Osborne described as one of their worst receptions. As a response, Mr. Bungle got on stage and performed only white noise during the entire hour set.) Amid the creation of Angel Dust in 1992, he told MTV that most grunge and alternative rock music was "rehashed" and later stopped listening to those genres altogether because he considered them "pathetic". (Note: Despite his opinion on 1990s rock, Patton admires the voice and songwriting of Mark Lanegan, who became known as the frontman of grunge band Screaming Trees, especially because he "put all that stuff to rest" and began making more unconventional music.) By contrast, Patton had a strong affinity to experimental artists that explored the possibilities of new technologies, such as Grotus, as well as orchestral-based ones like Frank Sinatra and Mystic Moods Orchestra, whom he called "timeless". Asked to curate the 2008 All Tomorrow's Parties Festival, Patton only chose world music artists, modernist composers and experimental musicians. The cosmopolitan inclinations of Patton are evident in his hobbies on tour, which include visiting local record stores and immersing himself in the culture of the areas (on occasion, fans have spotted him wandering through populous places in countries like Japan and Chile). Accordingly, Patton has spoken out against Americanization and the high esteem held by other countries for the United States. (Note: In 2020, the first song that Mr. Bungle released after their twenty-year hiatus was a cover of "Fuck the U.S.A.", an Anti-Americanist song by Scottish punk rock band The Exploited.) In the late 2000s, he also showed enthusiasm for the increasing innovations in music software and digital instruments, with the hope that they would allow younger generations to break new musical ground. A self-taught producer, Patton mostly scoffs at the hiring of producers, ascribing their need to the inabilities of the musicians themselves – "If you need to be told what to do, then you don't know what you want."

[The major label's] world is not about doing what you can to keep the artist happy, it's not about music, it's about spend, spend, spend and get the band in debt and keep them drunk and compromise their art and that's that. ... One of the things you realize [by releasing albums independently] is, it's your money! So don't go to some expensive studio and hire some guy to hold your golf clubs, just make your fucking record and get the fuck out of there! [Whispering] You might make some money on your records!

— Patton on his motivation to start Ipecac Recordings, 2003

A major feature throughout Patton's career has been to collaborate with and promote many relatively unknown musicians, either via direct projects or releases through his own label. In 1999, he and manager Greg Werckman of the Dead Kennedys co-founded Ipecac Recordings, a label that serves as hotbed for "misfit" artists and only makes one-record licensings (i.e., unlike traditional contracts, the artists can leave at any time they want). In its first year, Ipecac released music by noise music artist Merzbow, special education children band The Kids of Widney High, and Patton's avant-garde grindcore band Fantômas. The label grew from Patton's discontent with his previous label experiences and the underhanded nature of the music industry. "I'm a musician first and a businessman second," he stated. "I got tired of working with labels who didn't understand anything other than giant rock albums. There's so much interesting music that deserves to be heard; all those artists deserve to be treated with respect." In relation to multi-record contracts, the singer added, "How can labels own a musician? I don't pay attention to the rest of the industry. We just focus on what we like. ... We wanted to find a place where we could find interesting music controlled by the own musician." Ipecac gives entire creative and release control to the artists, keeps minimal overhead costs and instead focuses on efficient recordings. They put major emphasis on giving royalty checks to artists, which, as a result of their approach, are higher than the average, and exceedingly so when their records sell well. Since the establishment of Ipecac, Patton has self-produced and self-released most of his catalog, including his new albums with Faith No More and Mr. Bungle.

A big part of Patton's negative views on the entertainment industry was born out of witnessing the behind the scenes of Faith No More's 1992 world tour as a support band for Guns N' Roses and Metallica, the two most successful heavy metal acts at the time. Although the music and views of Faith No More were in stark contrast with them, the band accepted most tour deals at the time in order to expand their audience. Patton remarked: "Whether you like it or not, it's the top. Of course we found that thought exciting. But once you're at it, you realize it's total and utter bullshit." He and his bandmates constantly disparaged those shows amidst the tour; after a Melody Maker interview where Patton spread out rumors about Axl Rose going bald and using a toupée, the band was put on hold for five hours while Rose confronted them to either step down from the remaining dates or stop their behavior.

Patton expressed cynicism about the infamous lifestyles of rock stars. He told the San Francisco Chronicle in 1995, "It's hard to see as much as you'd like with our schedule on the road, but it's harder to do coke and fuck whores every night. Now that's a full time job." In the 2000 essay How We Eat Our Young, he mocked the romanticization of popular musicians by comparing their work, including his, to peeping toms and thieves. Patton was also fond of "play[ing] with" people whose "egos [got] tied in with" them, for example he constantly made fun of Anthony Kiedis in interviews after the latter accused him of stealing his style, and afterward did the same with new wave band INXS who became upset when Patton laughed off an offer to join them. Another occurrence was his ridicule of the macho persona displayed by metal band Pantera: in 1999, he proclaimed that vocalist Phil Anselmo finally "came out of the closet" and on another show claimed that an attendant stopped for illicitly stage diving deserved it because he wore a Pantera shirt. In the early 2000s, Patton was asked to be part of a new supergroup—later named Velvet Revolver—that would feature original members of Guns N' Roses. Patton, again, laughed at the request, telling a reporter, "I think everyone else knows [why I was not interested], except them. Which is the funny part." Instead, the singer joined mathcore band the Dillinger Escape Plan for a 2002 EP. (Note: In 2006, Patton was also approached to join crossover thrash pioneers The Accüsed, a proposal which flattered him because he admired them as a teen, but could not join in because his schedule was fully booked until 2009. Patton instead suggested vocalist Brad Mowen, who ended up in the band.) Consequence of Sound deemed Patton "the epitome of the anti-rock star."

Around the turn of the millennium, there was a tribute album to Faith No More in progress that featured Disturbed, Deftones and several nu metal bands, but Patton lampooned it in interviews as soon as he heard about it, statements that prompted its cancellation. In 2005, DJ magazine Big Shot contacted Patton to interview dance music artist Moby, who was a fan of Fantômas, to promote his new album Hotel. Patton accepted but decided not to hear the record in advance, and the conversation was awkward, with the singer describing Moby's material as "electronic wallpaper shit". In 2006, a video of him mocking hard rock band Wolfmother during their Lollapalooza set went viral. The incident happened amid an unscripted interview done to Patton in the surroundings of the venue, when he suddenly stopped to remark, "Are you hearing this shit?! What year are we in? [In reference to the band's 1970s rock sound.] Forgive me, but Wolfmother you suck. ... Sorry, I was about to [puke.]" The next year, a TV advert for his group Peeping Tom featured Patton ironically lauding Wolfmother. In 2007, the singer was asked about his opinion on Foo Fighters, among other mainstream rock artists, to which he called it "meaningless to me ... is that even music?", criticizing bandleader Dave Grohl's squander of his massive reach, resources and drumming skills to "dance around with a guitar." By the same token, when progressive bands like the Mars Volta, Radiohead and Mastodon were having enormous commercial success that year, Patton remarked: "The state of rock is wonderful right now. I've never been happier."

=== Clothing and fashion ===
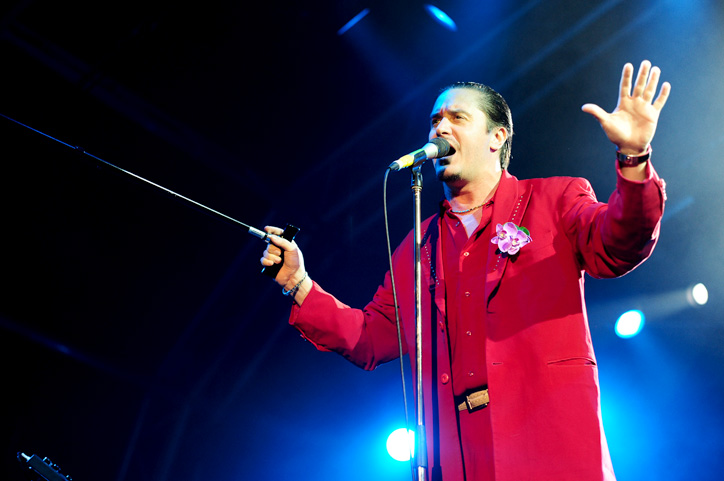
Patton in red suit using a cane with Faith No More (2010)

In his first years with Faith No More, Patton had a long hairstyle without facial hair, wore baggy clothes and displayed an "unkempt style". Amidst that time, he shaved the sides of his head a bit, coming close to a mullet. GQ noted that these looks—also sported by Anthony Kiedis—were common in 1980s Los Angeles, and they differed from the grunge aesthetic which was popular at the time. The magazine considers both vocalists as its best-known exemplars.

Around 1992's Angel Dust, Patton started to explore his "masculinity" through diverse anti-fashion styles. In 1992 he and keyboardist Roddy Bottum pierced their right and left eyebrows, respectively. Kerrang! wrote that some aspects of this fashion influenced that of nu metal. For the 1995 album King For a Day... Fool For a Lifetime, all the members of Faith No More, excluding Mike Bordin, shaved their heads, which in the following months, for Patton, became "unkempt and overgrown, complementing a thick, lazy moustache". During this period, the San Francisco Chronicle observed that the way he dressed lent him to probably "be mistaken for a blue-collar worker".

Since around 2000, the singer has mostly used suits, along with boutonnières, slicked-back hair, and both a short moustache and beard. He has sometimes varied them with "slightly hippier" attires or basketball jerseys. GQ praised the first style for its "simplicity and darkness with a touch of European elegance", that stands in contrast with the established looks of mainstream musicians.

=== Fanbase ===
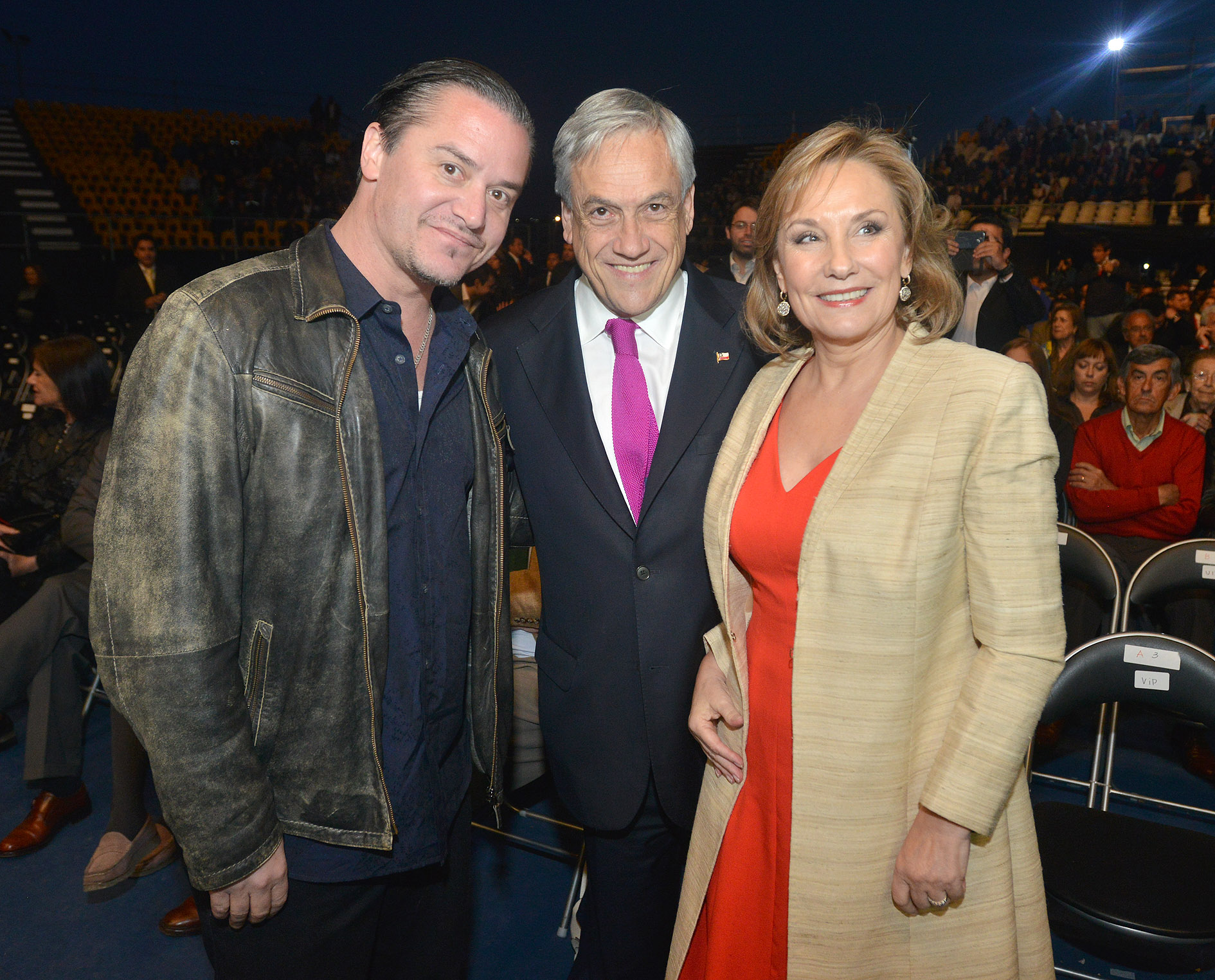
Patton in Santiago, alongside Chilean president Sebastián Piñera and First Lady Cecilia Morel, in 2013. The singer has a significant following in South America.

Although Faith No More had a major influence on several mainstream American acts, they found more commercial success in other territories after The Real Thing, such as Australia, Europe and South America. Patton's charisma and artistry led the band to garner a "cult-like devotion" by numerous fans, as well as to treat him like, as some authors have described, a "deity". Throughout the world, multiple online communities dedicated to Faith No More and Patton's projects have emerged since 1995, and there were hundreds of websites exclusively about the singer by the mid-2000s. Many of those created in the 1990s remain active today. Raziq Rauf at Classic Rock believes that his egotistical, resolute dismissal of mainstream trends and conventions is what led his audience to stick up for him: "He never asked for their loyalty, but he won it anyway."

In 2002, Patton was reported as having a "mixed relationship" with his fanbase and the press, and, even though a non-reclusive person, some aspects of his fame had "freak[ed] him out" – "[Patton is] a private person who'd much rather shuffle through Burt Bacharach and Joe Meek CDs than talk about himself". At one point, he refused to give any interviews to promote Mr. Bungle.

In 1993, an Australian female fan handcuffed Patton to herself when he was backstage, remaining so for two hours until personnel from Faith No More could free him. Several fans had also tried to live outside of his house as of 1995. In July 2000, after Fantômas played at the Nottingham Rock City in England, a drunken male fan ran toward Patton and bit his neck, leading the singer to slap him across the face. Despite these incidents, he kept agreeing to talk or give interviews to his fans on several occasions while touring. In later interviews, Patton thought to have "gotten better" at dealing with admirers and reporters.

=== Feud with Anthony Kiedis ===
[Kiedis, who] had still not forgiven [Mike] Patton for being a similarly pretty, long-haired singer who happened to be prettier, younger and sing better, managed to become totally irrelevant [by 1999], and then more popular than ever, thanks to musical vulture/magpie/compressor extraordinaire Rick Rubin. ... Not only was the [Patton's] third Mr. Bungle album delayed, but every festival appearance they'd been booked for at which the Chilis were also playing got cancelled at the behest of erstwhile bridge-lurker Kiedis.

— Fact, 2014

For over 30 years, Patton and Red Hot Chili Peppers singer Anthony Kiedis have been involved in an ongoing feud. Prior to that feud, Faith No More (then fronted by Chuck Mosley) and the Red Hot Chili Peppers had toured together. However, things turned ugly between the two bands in 1989 when Kiedis accused Mosley's replacement, Patton, of imitating his style on stage and in their music video for their biggest hit, "Epic". The two took shots at each other in the media throughout 1990.

The relationship was thought to have improved in the ensuing years, with Kiedis and Patton having face-to-face encounters in the 1990s that were described as friendly. The feud between the two was unexpectedly reignited in 1999. Mr. Bungle was scheduled to release their album California on June 8, 1999, but Warner Bros. Records pushed the release back a week so as not to coincide with the Chili Peppers' similarly titled album, Californication. Following the album release date clash, Mr. Bungle claimed that Kiedis had them removed from a series of summer festivals in Europe. Mr. Bungle's guitarist, Trey Spruance, added that the manager of the Chili Peppers apologized and blamed Kiedis for the removals. In retaliation, Mr. Bungle parodied the Red Hot Chili Peppers in Pontiac, Michigan, on Halloween of 1999. They covered several of the band's songs, with Patton deliberately using incorrect lyrics, such as "Sometimes I feel like a fucking junkie" on "Under the Bridge". In the middle of the concert, bassist Trevor Dunn (dressed as Flea) walked up to guitarist Spruance (dressed as the ghost of Hillel Slovak) and simulated injecting him with heroin. Patton (dressed as Kiedis) interrupted this by shouting, "You can't shoot up a ghost". Kiedis responded by having them removed from the 2000 Big Day Out festival in Australia and New Zealand. Kiedis said of the festival shows, "I would not have given two fucks if they played there with us. But after I heard about [the] Halloween show where they mocked us, fuck him and fuck the whole band." Mr. Bungle ceased being active a year after the controversy with Kiedis. Patton continued to mock Kiedis in the media with his new band Fantômas, calling him a "noodle dick" in a 2001 television interview. Despite the ongoing animosity towards one another, Patton during a 2010 interview expressed his desire to move past the feud, claiming he and Kiedis would have a warm embrace if the two were ever to meet in person. Despite this, Kiedis and the band would exhibit another possible gesture aimed at Patton during a concert in 2014 when the band jokingly teased the Faith No More song "We Care a Lot" during a performance at Barclays Center in Brooklyn.

Several publications, such as Complex and Phoenix New Times, have since listed the Kiedis–Patton feud as being one of the best beefs in the history of rock. Others have labelled it as a "funk metal feud" and "absurd".

== Personal life ==
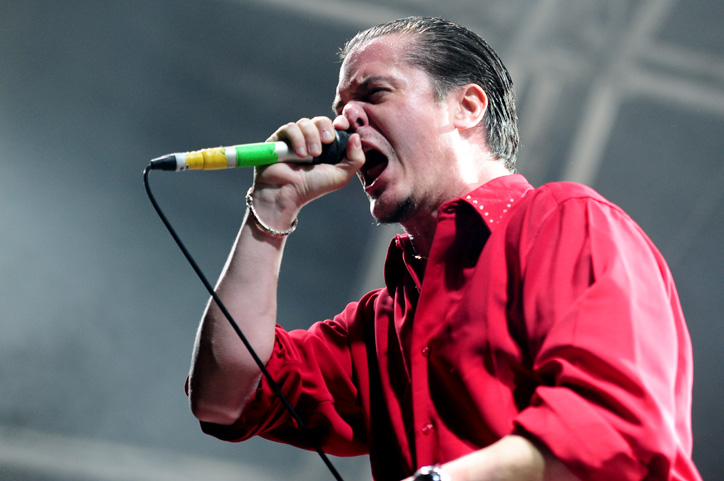
Patton performing with Faith No More at the 2010 Soundwave Festival in Perth, Australia

=== Relationships ===
Patton married Cristina Zuccatosta, an Italian artist, in 1994. The couple divided their time between San Francisco, US and Bologna, Italy. The couple separated in 2001, but later reconciled. Patton has referred to her as his "best friend" and says that "she probably understands [him] more than [he]" himself does. He has no children. Patton enjoys his privacy and maintains few deep relationships in his life. In 2002, Patton admitted that his hectic schedule had hindered some of his personal relationships, but nonetheless he emphasized that music is his priority.

Patton has been known to have a long-time friendship with drummer Dave Lombardo originating from the two collaborating during the formation of Fantômas in 1998. Patton has also been known to be friends with System of a Down frontman Serj Tankian. One of Patton's friends is actor Danny DeVito, who continually goes to concerts by Patton. They met after DeVito and his son attended a Fantômas show at the 2005 Coachella Festival.

=== Health ===
During his third concert with Faith No More, Patton's right hand was permanently numbed after he fell down on a broken bottle that severed his tendons and nerves. The next day, he spent five and half hours in reconstructive microsurgery. He learned to use his hand again, but has no feeling in it (despite his doctor telling him the opposite situation would happen).

In 2022, Patton disclosed that he was diagnosed as suffering from agoraphobia, which had resulted in the cancellation of Faith No More and Mr. Bungle performances in 2021.

=== Interests and hobbies ===
Patton owns a massive record collection and, as of 2005, he regularly traveled to Japan with John Zorn to buy albums. Patton is not "so sensitive to musical climates" and believes that some of the best art tends to "fall through the cracks", thus he invests a considerable amount of time in search of non-mainstream artists. This was one of his reasons for the establishment of Ipecac Recordings. In 1999, Patton said: "I like going into some place like [record store] Amoeba and saying 'O.K. what's gonna change my life today?'" Patton's favorite moment during a promotional cycle in 1995 was to spend $20,000 on a jazz record binge with his bandmate Bordin in Paris. In 2010, he wrote a testimonial for Record Store Day as support for those independent businesses, calling them his "candy shops!"

Patton is a foodie. While on tour he likes to try different cuisines, "whether it's some high-end snobby shit or some low-down barbecue in someone's back yard." His record Pranzo Oltranzista revolves around futurist cooking and he has given thematic interviews about food. Meeting up with friends over a meal is his main social activity besides music. He has several favorite restaurants in San Francisco that he visits regularly.

Since childhood, Patton has been an avid fan of basketball team Los Angeles Lakers. He is also a baseball fan, which in the past he considered "a guilty pleasure." Patton supports the Italy national football team.

In between tours, Patton practiced swimming and weight training.

=== Other ===
Patton's numerous projects and constant touring have led him to be widely identified as a "workaholic". Patton, who is addicted to coffee, has kept around three projects going on simultaneously throughout the years. By 2006 he did not go on vacation, but says that his workflow is natural for him and does not "feel comfortable unless [he has] got a few unfinished things".

Until 2001, Patton owned a home in Bologna and became a fluent speaker of Italian. These events tied him closely to Italian culture and its popular music of the mid-20th century. Patton was also conversational in Spanish until the 1990s; he still understands the language. In addition, he spoke Portuguese slang.

== Legacy ==
In most areas in our culture, fame and wealth are universally admired and respected, it doesn't matter what it took to get there. Patton rejects all of that. For a frontman, he's fairly comfortable being the center of attention, and he's not a self-promoter. He's certainly got the looks and talent to be famous, but he absolutely doesn't care about that. Maybe that's why he's won the respect of so many musicians.

— Revolver, 2002

A list published by Consequence of Sound based on vocal range acknowledged Mike Patton as "the greatest singer of all time" in popular music. Before the disbandment of Faith No More in 1998, Patton was already highly respected by colleagues and listeners, and this continued with his multiple experimental releases that ensued it. In terms of influence, PopMatters regards him as one of the two most important rock frontmen of the 1990s alongside Kurt Cobain. Nonetheless, Patton downplays his prominence with light-hearted self-deprecation, and was very critical of his earlier work.

The versatility and skill of Patton's vocals on the first Faith No More and Mr. Bungle albums were "groundbreaking", features that, along with the experimental rock instrumentations of his bandmates, inspired a generation of musicians that came after him. While Patton finished his second record with Faith No More—Angel Dust of 1992 —Warner Bros warned them that it would be a "commercial suicide" due to the significant stylistic departure that they began venturing on, yet, eventually, in 2003 Kerrang! magazine described it as the most influential album of the past two decades. Although Patton could easily have capitalized on any of those records after their release, critics extol that he kept reinventing himself and constantly looking for new approaches throughout the years. Several authors have called him a "Renaissance man". Writing about the multifaceted endeavors of Patton, Robert Barry stated:

The world he moves in is occupied as much by academically-minded and conservatory-trained musicians as punks and freaks. ... [But his diversity] should not be dismissed as superficial po-mo posturing. In fact it could be compared to that of Olivier Messiaen. ... "There is nothing superficial about Messiaen's eclecticism," said conductor Pierre Boulez, and "Just as we can speak of eclecticism in his choice of composers, so his actual style of writing – juxtaposing and superimposing rather than developing and transforming – may be called eclectic." Words that could just as easily have been written about Patton.

Patton has often been credited as an influence to nu metal, a form of alternative metal spearheaded by bands such as Korn and Limp Bizkit in the late 1990s. He has been less than enthusiastic about being linked to such bands, stating in a 2002 interview that "Nu-metal makes my stomach turn". A reviewer at The Quietus opined that, notwithstanding Faith No More's far-reaching legacy, the most valuable contribution of Patton has been using his platform "to become one of the most potent driving forces in avant-garde and alternative music", through his diverse projects and collaborations, and the experimental artists he has signed to Ipecac Recordings.

In addition to his legacies with Faith No More, Mr. Bungle and Fantômas, numerous artists cite Mike Patton directly as an inspiration. Prominent singers such as Chino Moreno (Deftones), Brandon Boyd (Incubus), Ville Valo (HIM), Jacoby Shaddix (Papa Roach), Greg Puciato (The Dillinger Escape Plan), Jesse Leach (Killswitch Engage), Ivan Moody (Five Finger Death Punch), Justin Pierre (Motion City Soundtrack), Daryl Palumbo (Glassjaw), Howard Jones (Killswitch Engage), Claudio Sanchez (Coheed and Cambria), Tommy Rogers (Between the Buried and Me), Daniel Gildenlöw (Pain of Salvation), Doug Robb (Hoobastank), Tommy Vext (Divine Heresy), Hernan Hermida (Suicide Silence), Dimitri Minakakis (The Dillinger Escape Plan), Mike Vennart (Oceansize), Spencer Sotelo (Periphery), CJ McMahon (Thy Art Is Murder) and Kin Etik (Twelve Foot Ninja) have all cited Patton as their primary influence.

Devin Townsend proclaimed in 2011: "Angel Dust into Mr. Bungle changed every singer in heavy music. Patton is a living treasure." Artistically, he has been named the biggest influence for Slipknot, Mushroomhead and Igorrr, and a major one on Josh Homme (Queens of the Stone Age), Serj Tankian (System of a Down) and The Avett Brothers.

== Discography ==
Studio albums

- Adult Themes for Voice (1996)
- Pranzo Oltranzista (1997)
- Mondo Cane (2010)

== Selected filmography ==
- 1990 – You Fat Bastards: Live at the Brixton Academy, London by Faith No More (VHS)
- 1993 – Video Macumba – Short film compiled by Mike Patton containing abstract and extreme footage
- 1993 – Video Croissant by Faith No More (VHS) Released in 1993 it features some of the band's music videos up to that date.
- 1998 – Who Cares a Lot? The Greatest Videos by Faith No More (VHS)
- 2002 – A Bookshelf on Top of the Sky: 12 Stories About John Zorn
- 2005 – Firecracker – Frank/David
- 2006 – Double Feature: Live at the Brixton Academy, London (You Fat Bastards) / Who Cares a Lot? The Greatest Videos by Faith No More (DVD)
- 2007 – Kaada/Patton Live – Live performance DVD
- 2007 – I Am Legend – Creature Vocals (voice) (credited as Michael A. Patton)
- 2008 – A Perfect Place – Short film soundtrack by Patton (Released with film as CD/DVD special edition)
- 2008 – Live from London 2006 – Live DVD release of a performance by the Fantômas/Melvins Big Band in London on May 1, 2006
- 2008 – Metalocalypse – Patton voices the character of reformed rocker Rikki Kixx on episodes "Snakes n Barrels II" part one and part two. This special 2 part, half-hour presentation aired on Adult Swim August 24, 2008.
- 2009 – Crank: High Voltage – Film Score
- 2010 – The Solitude of Prime Numbers – Film Score
- 2010 – Bunraku – Narrator
- 2012 – The Place Beyond the Pines – Film Score
- 2016 – The Absence of Eddy Table – Voice of Eddy Table
- 2017 – 1922 – Film Score

== Video game voice work ==
- 2007 – The Darkness – Voice of The Darkness (Starbreeze Studios)
- 2007 – Portal – Voice of the Anger Core (Valve)
- 2008 – Left 4 Dead – Infected voices, Smoker, Hunter (Valve)
- 2009 – Bionic Commando – Voice of Nathan Spencer – the Bionic Commando (Capcom)
- 2009 – Left 4 Dead 2 – Infected voices, Smoker, Hunter (Valve)
- 2012 – The Darkness II – Voice of The Darkness (Digital Extremes)
- 2016 – Edge of Twilight – Return to Glory – Vocals for Lithern and Creatures (FUZZYEYES)
