= Nevermen =

American experimental music supergroup

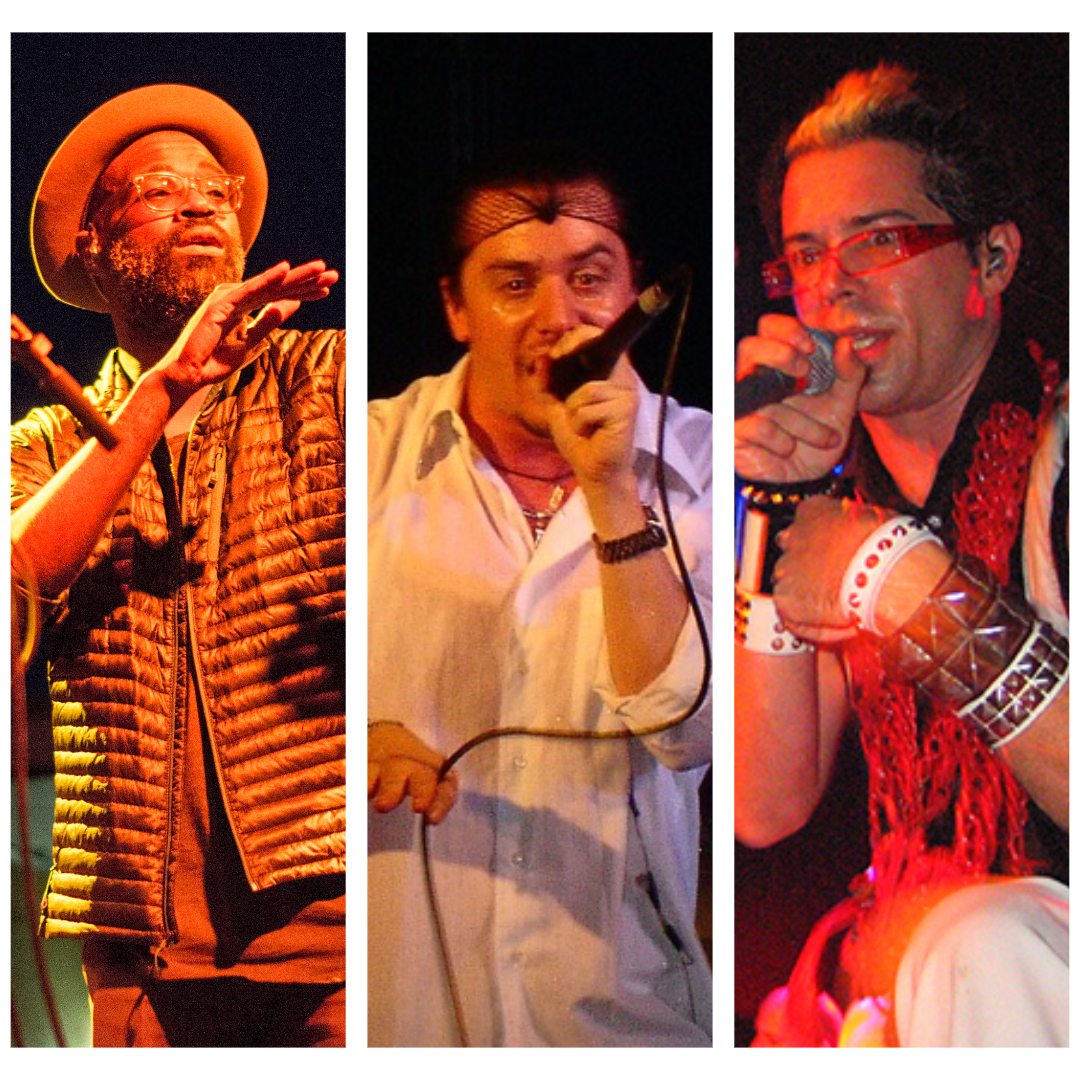
- Lineup of Nevermen. From left to right: Tunde Adebimpe, Mike Patton, Adam "Doseone" Drucker

Background information
- Origin: United States
- Genre: Experimental
- Years active: 2008–present
- Labels: Ipecac Recordings, Lex Records
- Members: Tunde Adebimpe; Mike Patton; Adam "Doseone" Drucker
- Website: nevermen.com

Nevermen is an American musical supergroup. It consists of Tunde Adebimpe, Mike Patton, and Adam "Doseone" Drucker. It was listed by Paste as one of the "20 Best New Bands of 2015".

== History ==
Nevermen was formed in 2008, when Adam "Doseone" Drucker jammed with Tunde Adebimpe in a Brooklyn warehouse. Later, the two sent some of the music to Mike Patton. The trio refined the recordings with one another over the years.

On August 5, 2015, Nevermen released their debut track, "Tough Towns". It was, according to Doseone, "dedicated to anyone remotely young, feeling inexplicably inspired in the 'nowhere' they are from." On December 4, 2015, the group released another track, "Mr Mistake". Boards of Canada released a remix of the song on January 12, 2016. On January 22, 2016, the group released their third track, "Hate On".

On January 29, 2016, Nevermen released their debut album, also titled Nevermen. It debuted at number 9 on Billboard's Heatseekers Albums chart. At Metacritic, it received an average score of 69 out of 100, based on 19 reviews, indicating "generally favorable reviews".

== Discography ==
=== Albums ===
- Nevermen (2016)

=== Singles ===
- "Tough Towns" (2015)
- "Mr Mistake" (2015)
- "Hate On" (2016)
- “Treat Em Right (Boards of Canada Remix)” (2021)
