= Pranzo Oltranzista =

Studio album by Mike Patton
- Released: April 22, 1997
- Genre: Sound collage; musique concrète; experimental; avant-garde jazz
- Length: 31:18
- Label: Tzadik
- Producer: Mike Patton

Mike Patton chronology
Adult Themes for Voice (1996)	Pranzo Oltranzista (1997)	A Perfect Place (2008)

Professional ratings
Review scores
Source	Rating
AllMusic	3/5 stars

Pranzo Oltranzista is Mike Patton's second solo project. It is subtitled "Musica da Tavola per Cinque" (literally translated as Banquet Piece for Five Players), and is based on "Futurist Cookbook" by Filippo Tommaso Marinetti, written in 1932. Following the experimental Adult Themes for Voice, it contains numerous tracks linked by culinary themes and best listened to as a unitary movement. Featuring Marc Ribot on guitar, William Winant on percussion, Erik Friedlander on cello and John Zorn on alto sax, this is Patton's most technically sophisticated solo project.

== Track listing ==
All tracks written by Mike Patton.

No.	Title	English title	Length
1.	"Elettricità Atmosferiche Candite"	Candied Atmospheric Electricities	1:19
2.	"Carne Cruda Squarciata dal Suono di Sassofono"	Raw Meat Torn by Saxophone Sound	2:32
3.	"Vivanda in Scodella"	Meal in a Bowl	3:15
4.	"Guerra in Letto"	War in Bed	1:51
5.	"Contorno Tattile (per Russolo)"	Tactile Side Dish (for Russolo)	2:01
6.	"I Rumori Nutrienti"	The Nutrient Noises	4:26
7.	"Garofani allo Spiedo"	Geraniums on a Spit	2:56
8.	"Aerovivanda"	Aeromeal	2:33
9.	"Scoppioingola"	Explosion in the Throat	3:00
10.	"Latte alla Luce Verde"	Green Light Milk	3:24
11.	"Bombe a Mano"	Hand Grenades	4:00
Total length:			31:18

== Personnel ==
- Erik Friedlander - cello
- Mike Patton - voice, sound effects
- Marc Ribot - guitar
- William Winant - percussion
- John Zorn - alto saxophone
