= Adult Themes for Voice =

Studio album by Mike Patton
- Released: April 23, 1996
- Genre: Experimental, noise
- Length: 43:00
- Label: Tzadik
- Producer: Mike Patton

Mike Patton chronology
Adult Themes for Voice (1996)	Pranzo Oltranzista (1997)

Adult Themes for Voice is a 1996 album by Mike Patton. Recorded in hotel rooms while touring as a member of Faith No More, the album is solely composed of vocal sounds arranged as noise music. Released on John Zorn's Tzadik Records label, the album has largely met with negative reviews citing its abstruse and inaccessible nature.

== Production ==
Adult Themes for Voice is composed entirely of sounds produced vocally by Mike Patton, featuring no other instrumentation. The compositions include sounds described as "harsh scraping noises, squeaks, and underwater sounds". Patton recalled similar vocal experimentation from his childhood, first having taught himself to sing by imitating non-verbal sounds, and later being gifted a record by his parents which he described as "this little flexi-disc of mouth sounds, like guys that could make odd sounds. I don't know why they gave it to me, but that was one of my favourite records". The album was recorded in various hotel rooms while on tour as a member of Faith No More, using a TASCAM four-track Portastudio.

== Release and reception ==
Adult Themes for Voice was released on April 23, 1996, on Tzadik Records. Tzadik is operated by John Zorn, a long-time collaborator with Patton.

AllMusic's Greg Prato rated the album three stars out of five, stating "there isn't a note of music on the album; it's essentially noise". Prato noted that the music's composition meant that songs flowed into each other "as a continuous piece", and could not point out any specific highlights as a result. Writing for Exclaim!, Joe Smith-Englehardt has described the album as "noise for the sake of noise", noting Patton's "incredibly unique vocals". Simon Young, writing for Kerrang!, described both Adult Themes for Voice and Patton's follow-up, Pranzo Oltranzista, as "expensive lessons in buyer’s remorse". Writing in the book Avant Rock: Experimental Music from the Beatles to Bjork, philosophy professor Bill Martin compared the album to Yoko Ono's 1971 release Fly, and to the vocal techniques of Cathy Berberian and Joan La Barbara. Martin described the album as "quite radical", but questioned whether it would appeal to any particular audience.

== Track listing ==
All tracks are written by Mike Patton.

No.	Title	Length
1.	"Wuxiapian"	2:12
2.	"I Killed Him Like a Dog... And He Still Laughed"	0:56
3.	"Smog"	0:45
4.	"The Man in the Lower Left Hand Corner of the Photograph"	1:47
5.	"Robot Sex (Neon)"	0:25
6.	"Screams of the Asteroid"	0:55
7.	"Robot Sex" (B/W)"	0:16
8.	"Porno Holocaust"	1:00
9.	"Inconsolable Widows in Search of Distraction"	3:09
10.	"Hurry Up and Kill Me... I'm Cold"	0:06
11.	"Man Alone In Steambath"	1:01
12.	"Guinea Pig 1"	0:35
13.	"Guinea Pig 2"	1:26
14.	"Guinea Pig 3"	0:16
15.	"Guinea Pig 4"	1:42
16.	"A Woman with the Skin of the Moon"	0:37
17.	"A Lizard with the Skin of a Woman"	1:38
18.	"Catheter"	1:18
19.	"Fix It So the Bruises Don't Show"	1:20
20.	"Robot Sex (watercolors)"	0:24
21.	"A Ceremony of Senses, an Alibi In The Red Light District"	0:40
22.	"Butterfly in a Glass Maze"	2:19
23.	"Pajama Party Horror"	0:57
24.	"A Leper with the Face of a Baby Girl"	2:40
25.	"The One Armed vs. 9 killers"	1:17
26.	"Pillow Biter"	2:42
27.	"Raped on a Bed of Sand"	1:46
28.	"Violence⁵"	2:17
29.	"Red Mouth, Black Orgasm"	0:26
30.	"Wuxiapian Fantastique"	0:16
31.	"A Smile, A Slap in the Face, A Fart, A Kiss on the Mouth"	0:26
32.	"Private Lessons on Planet Eros"	0:36
33.	"Pneumonia with Complications"	0:13
34.	"Orgy in Reverb (10 Kilometers of Lust)"	4:53
Total length:		43:00

== Footnotes ==
=== References ===
- Harte, Adrian (2018). Small Victories: The True Story of Faith No More. Jawbone Press. ISBN 978-1911036371.
- Martin, Bill (2015). Avant Rock: Experimental Music from the Beatles to Bjork. Open Court. ISBN 978-0812699395.
- Adult Themes for Voice (booklet). Mike Patton. Tzadik Records. 1996.
