= Nevermen (album) =

Studio album by Nevermen
- Released: January 29, 2016
- Genre: Experimental
- Length: 38:24
- Label: Ipecac Recordings, Lex Records
- Producer: Nevermen

Singles from Nevermen
- 1. "Tough Towns" Released: 2015; 2. "Mr Mistake" Released: 2015; 3. "Hate On" Released: 2016

Nevermen is the debut studio album by Nevermen. It was released via Ipecac Recordings and Lex Records on January 29, 2016. It debuted at number 9 on Billboard's Heatseekers Albums chart. The artwork was designed by Keith Tyson. A music video was created for "Mr Mistake".

== Critical reception ==
Professional ratings
Aggregate scores
Source	Rating
Metacritic	69/100
Review scores
Source	Rating
AllMusic	3/5 stars
Alternative Press	3.5/5 stars
Clash	7/10
Consequence of Sound	B−
The Irish Times	3/5 stars
Now	1/5 stars
Pitchfork	5.8/10
PopMatters	7/10 stars
Rolling Stone	3.5/5 stars
The Skinny	4/5 stars

At Metacritic, which assigns a weighted average score out of 100 to reviews from mainstream critics, the album received an average score of 69, based on 19 reviews, indicating "generally favorable reviews".

Robert Ham of Alternative Press gave the album 3.5 stars out of 5, saying, "Musically, their individual sensibilities mash together into delicious thick swirls of modern electronica, but their insistence on including everyone's vocals in each song turns out to be more dizzying than necessary." Leor Galil of Consequence of Sound gave the album a grade of B−, saying, "When all three voices join together with the precision of a diamond laser-cutter, they're an unparalleled force." Chris Conaton of PopMatters gave the album 7 stars out of 10, calling it "an album that feels like a group of experienced musicians experimenting and amusing themselves without sacrificing a core thread of melody."

Zoe Camp of Pitchfork gave the album a 5.8 out of 10, saying, "The album's best songs ('Tough Towns,' 'Fame II the Wreckoning,' 'Treat Em Right') temper the stream-of-consciousness and ramp up the atmosphere instead." Dave Kerr of The Skinny gave the album 4 stars out of 5 and described it as "a timeless, genre-smashing work with a psychedelic soul."

== Track listing ==
No.	Title	Length
1.	"Dark Ear"	3:35
2.	"Treat Em Right"	2:19
3.	"Wrong Animal Right Trap"	3:24
4.	"Tough Towns"	5:09
5.	"Hate On"	4:30
6.	"Mr Mistake"	2:46
7.	"Shellshot"	4:45
8.	"At Your Service"	2:54
9.	"Non Babylon"	3:13
10.	"Fame II the Wreckoning"	5:49

== Charts ==
Chart (2016)	Peak position
US Heatseekers Albums (Billboard)	9
US Independent Albums (Billboard)	25
US Top Rock Albums (Billboard)	41
