= Chris Daniels (musician) =

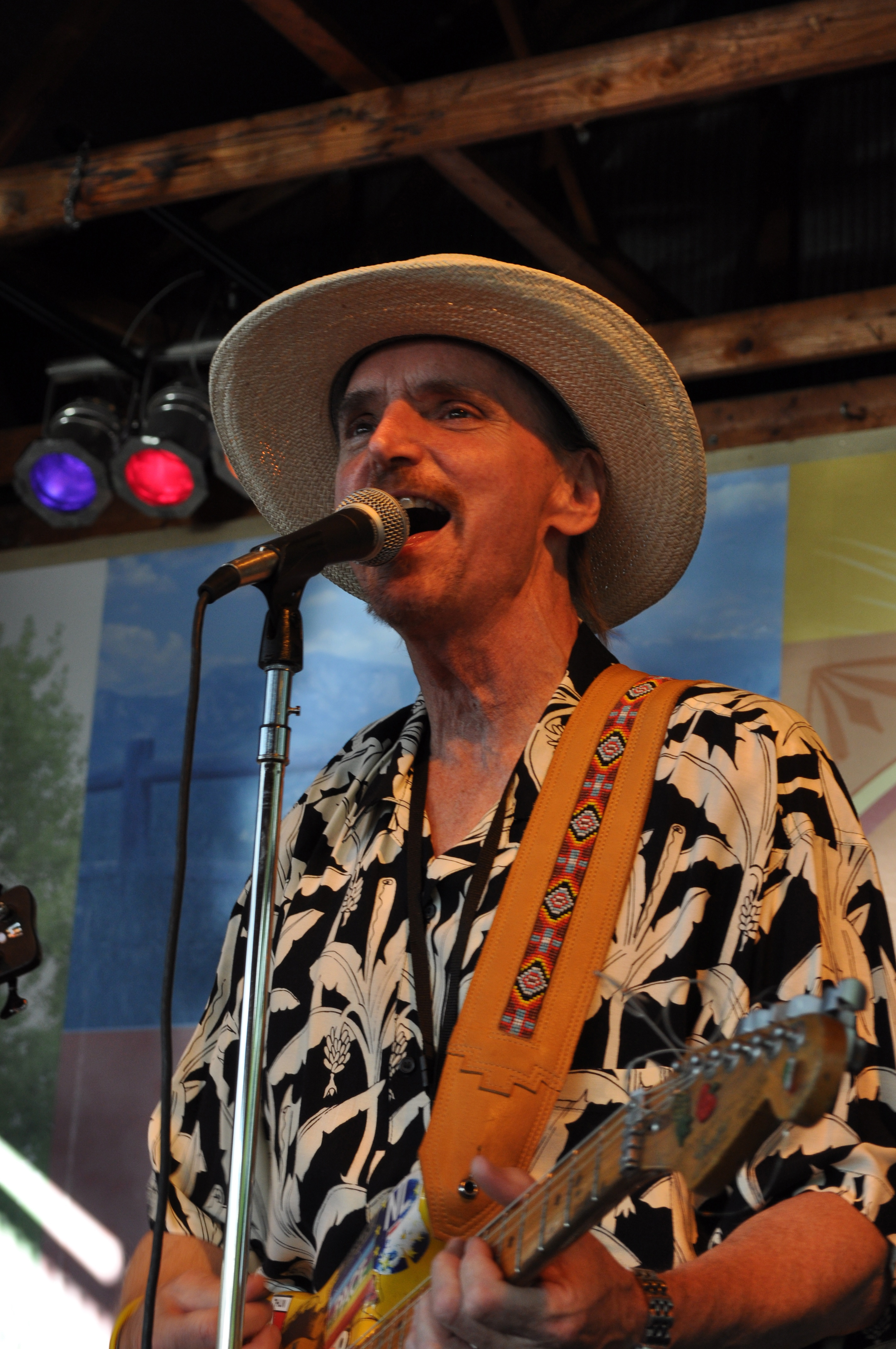

Background information
- Born: Christopher Williams Daniels; September 30, 1952 (age 73); St. Paul, Minnesota
- Genres: Jump blues, funk, R&B, soul
- Instrument(s): Vocals, guitar, mandolin, banjo, flute, percussion, pedal steel guitar
- Years active: 1971–present
- Labels: Moon Voyage, Provogue, Flying Fish
- Website: www.chrisdaniels.com

Chris "Spoons" Daniels (born September 30, 1952) is an American musician, singer, songwriter, and multi-instrumentalist. A member of the Colorado Music Hall of Fame, he is best known for his work with Chris Daniels & the Kings, a band he has led since 1984. He is considered an "icon of Colorado music" and is recognized for his role as a member of Magic Music, frequently described as Colorado's first jam band.

== Early life and career ==
Daniels was born in St. Paul, Minnesota, and began playing guitar when he was 10. At seventeen, he moved to the East Coast and performed with several groups, and for a short time played in a band led by David Johansen, who later formed The New York Dolls. In 1971, Daniels moved to Colorado, and in 1972 he joined the acoustic jam band, Magic Music, which would come to be regarded as Colorado's first jam band. In addition to songwriting and singing, Daniels played lead guitar, mandolin, and banjo with Magic Music, whose members included Will Luckey, George Cahill, Bill Makepeace, Navarro/Leftover Salmon bassist Rob Galloway and Kevin Mulburn. The group toured extensively in the United States and appeared at the 2nd and 3rd Telluride Bluegrass Festival. The band broke up in 1976. In 2018 television producer Lee Aronsohn filmed and released an award winning documentary about the band titled, 40 Years in the Making: The Magic Music Movie. He first learned about the band when reading about Daniels.

Daniels subsequently resumed his education, and attended Berklee College of Music and Macalester College. He graduated cum laude from Macalester in 1979.

After receiving his degree, Daniels returned to Colorado and formed Spoons, who in 1981 released the album Definitely Live on Sunshine Records. In 1982, he toured the United States with Russell Smith of the Amazing Rhythm Aces, performing on guitar, mandolin, and banjo. He also founded a late-night concert series called the "After Hours Jam" at the Sheridan Opera House in Telluride, during the Telluride Bluegrass Festival. He was the bandleader and master of ceremonies for the series, which also included performances by others. Daniels met David Bromberg at the After Hours Jam, and they later played together at concerts in Colorado, Chicago, and New York. In 1989, Daniels appeared on Bromberg's album Sideman Serenade.

In 1983 he performed with New Grass Revival at the Telluride Bluegrass Festival.

In 1984, Daniels formed Chris Daniels & The R&B Kings (later shortened to The Kings). Although originally planned as a "Boulder one-nighter," the band has released 14 albums and toured extensively in the United States and completed 21 European tours. Acclaimed for their live performances as well as their records, Chris Daniels & the Kings have performed at prestigious festivals including the Carolina Downhome Blues Festival, Parkpop in the Netherlands and Marktrock in Belgium. They have performed for three US presidents and the former queen of the Netherlands, and have been featured on a variety of American and European television shows. They became the Friday night headliner at the Telluride Bluegrass Festival in 1986 and continued in that role through 1991.

In addition to performing their own music—a blend of jump blues, funk, R&B and swing—the Kings served as the back up band for other artists.

In 1995, Daniels received a Master of Arts in History/Economic History at the University of Colorado at Boulder. From 1995 to 2000, he served as the executive director of the Swallow Hill Music Association, an influential roots, folk, and acoustic music school and concert organization. He began teaching in 2002 as an adjunct professor at Arapahoe Community College. Following his tenure at Arapahoe, he joined the faculty of the University of Colorado, Denver. He is an assistant professor in the College of Arts & Media and serves as the area head for the music business program.

Daniels was diagnosed with Acute Myeloid Leukemia in February 2010. He underwent chemotherapy and a bone marrow transplant via stem cells from his sister, Dr. Jane Moffet, and returned to recording, teaching and performing that fall. In 2012 he released Better Days, a solo album dedicated to "those who go through hard times." A return to roots music, it appeared on the national Americana charts.

As a songwriter, Daniels has collaborated with artists including Gary Nicholson, Al Kooper, and Bill Payne and his songs have appeared on albums by Hazel Miller and Tom Wasinger, among others. Daniels' music has been featured on the television show Men in Trees, and, as a commercial singer, he has worked on commercials for companies including McDonald's, Ford Motor Company, and Coors Beer.

Daniels was a co-nominee for a 2013 Grammy Award for Jumpin' Jazz Kids, a children's album he worked on with Al Jarreau, Hubert Laws and Dee Dee Bridgewater. That same year, Daniels was inducted into the Colorado Music Hall of Fame.

In 2015, Daniels released Funky to the Bone, which was critically acclaimed by international media outlets and blues and soul magazines including Downbeat and Roots Music Report. Daniels teaches full-time and performs more than 100 shows a year.

In early 2018, Daniels was named the executive director of the Colorado Music Hall of Fame.

In 2021 Daniels, Hazel Miller and Dana March released What We Did, an album that raised funds for Inner City Health Center, a health and wellness provider for underserved populations in Denver and the surrounding metro area.

In 2024, 2024 Chris Daniels & The Kings with Freddi Gowdy released 40: Blues With Horns Volume II celebrating their 40th year.

== Discography ==
| Year | Title | Artist | Label | Producer |
|---|---|---|---|---|
| 1981 | Definitely Live | Spoons | Sunshine Records | |
| 1983 | Juggler | Chris Daniels | Next Coast Records | |
| 1985 | Has Anyone Seen My Keys? | Chris Daniels & The R&B Kings | Harmony Records | Bob Burnham |
| 1987 | When You're Cool | Chris Daniels & The Kings | Moon Voyage Records | Jim Mason |
| 1990 | That's What I Like About the South | Chris Daniels & The Kings | Redstone Records/Provogue | Al Kooper |
| 1992 | In Your Face | Chris Daniels & The Kings | Chris Daniels & The Kings | Larry Wilkins |
| 1994 | Is My Love Enough | Chris Daniels & The Kings | Flying Fish Records/Sky Ranch-Virgin Records (Paris) | Chris Daniels/Bill Payne |
| 1995 | Live Wired | Chris Daniels & The Kings | Flat Canyon | Chris Daniels |
| 1997 | Louie Louie | Chris Daniels & The Kings | Moon Voyage | Chris Daniels |
| 2000 | Choice Cuts: The Best of... | Chris Daniels & The Kings | K-Tel Records/Moon Voyage Records | Chris Daniels |
| 2003 | The Spark | Chris Daniels & The Kings | Moon Voyage Records/Music & Words Records/Buffalo Records | Chris Daniels |
| 2005 | 10 | Chris Daniels & The Kings | Moon Voyage Records | Chris Daniels |
| 2008 | Stealin' the Covers | Chris Daniels & The Kings | Moon Voyage Records | Chris Daniels |
| 2010 | We'll Meet Again | Chris Daniels & The Kings | Moon Voyage Records/AmbianZ Records | Chris Daniels/Henk Schoomacher |
| 2012 | Better Days | Chris Daniels (solo album) | Moon Voyage Records | Chris Daniels/Jim Ratts/John McVey |
| 2015 | Funky to the Bone | Chris Daniels & The Kings | Moon Voyage Records | Chris Daniels/John McVey |
| 2017 | Blues with Horns, Vol. 1 | Chris Daniels & The Kings with Freddi Gowdy | Moon Voyage Records | |
