= Midnight Radio =

Midnight Radio may refer to:

- "Midnight Radio" (song), a song from Hedwig and the Angry Inch
- Midnight Radio (Big Head Todd and the Monsters album), 1990
- Midnight Radio (Bohren & der Club of Gore album), 1995
- Midnight Radio Network or Midnight Trucking Radio Network, a talk radio program
- Midnight Radio, a production company that worked on the TV series Zoo
- "I Love My Radio (Midnight Radio)", a 1985 song by Taffy
