= Stratagem =

Stratagem, Stratagems, or Strategema may refer to:

== Books ==
- Strategemata, or Stratagems, a first-century book by Frontinus
- Stratagems (Polyaenus), or Strategemata, a second-century book by Polyaenus
- One of the Thirty-Six Stratagems, a sixth-century essay by Wang Jingze

== Media ==
- Strategem (album), a 1994 album by Big Head Todd and the Monsters
- Stratagem, a powerful military equipment in Helldivers and Helldivers 2 video games
- "Stratagem" (Star Trek: Enterprise), an episode of Star Trek: Enterprise
- Strategem, a stage show written by and starring Steve Coogan as Alan Partridge.
- Strategema, a game featured in Star Trek

== Other uses ==
- Stratagem (deception), or ruse de guerre, a plan or scheme to deceive
- HMS Stratagem (P234), an S class submarine
