= Trudi Morrison =

American politician, professor, and activist (born 1950)

Trudi Michelle Morrison (born 1950) is an American politician, professor, and activist. Dr. Morrison was the highest-ranked Black woman in the White House as Associate Director of the Office of Public Liaison. She was the first woman and the first Black to serve as Senate Deputy-Sergeant-at-Arms in 1985, appointed by then U. S. Senate majority leader Bob Dole.

== Early life and family ==
Morrison was born in Denver, Colorado. Her mother was Marjorie Morrison, and her father was George Morrison Jr. Marjorie was a prominent figure during the Civil Rights Movement in Denver, having fought against racial discrimination in Colorado Women's College as well as Denver's racist banking and home-buying practices. Her paternal grandfather was George Morrison Sr., a highly esteemed jazz musician who was inducted into the Colorado Music Hall of Fame in October 2023.

== Education and activism ==
Morrison received a bachelor's degree in psychology from Colorado State University. She received a Juris Doctor from the National Law Center at George Washington University. Morrison was elected as the first African-American homecoming queen at CSU in 1970. During her coronation ceremony, she raised a black-gloved fist in the air to symbolize victory. The majority white student body interpreted this to mean "Black Power" and reacted by throwing a brick through her apartment window that same night. She was heavily involved in the campus's Black activist movement and co-founded the Black Student Alliance alongside Paul Chambers and Meredith Springs. She was one of 40 other African-American students enrolled at the university at the time. She was the first ever recipient of the William E. Morgan Alumni Achievement Award. She also received a Master of Science and a Doctor of Philosophy in political science from the University of Michigan in 1993.

== Career ==
Morrison's post-graduate career began in 1975, working for the state attorney's office in Maryland. She then returned to Colorado to work for the district attorney and for the Colorado Division of Criminal Justice. She returned to Washington, D.C. in 1981, where she was a deputy assistant secretary at the U.S. Department of Housing and Urban Development. She briefly returned to Colorado to work as the U.S. Department of Health and Human Services regional director for six states before returning to D.C. In 1983, Morrison became the highest-ranked Black woman in President Ronald Reagan's White House as Associate Director of the Office of Public Liaison and Director of the President's 50 States Project, an initiative to identify and encourage the eradication of gender disparities in state rules, regulations, and statutes. Morrison was successful in her travels to 38 states. In 1985, she was appointed by Senate majority leader Bob Dole as the first Black and first woman to serve as the Senate Deputy Sergeant-at-Arms. In 1997, she became Chief of the Office of Fair Employment Practices and, later, Senior Legal and Policy Adviser for the Administrative Office of the U.S Courts. She retired from politics in 2014 and now works as an adult literacy tutor.

She has a memoir released in May of 2025.
