= Riviera (Big Head Todd and the Monsters album) =

Studio album by Big Head Todd and the Monsters
- Released: March 26, 2002
- Recorded: 2001
- Studio: Flat Top's Wilderness
- Genres: Alternative rock; jangle pop
- Length: 52:31
- Language: English
- Label: Big
- Producer: Todd Park Mohr

Big Head Todd and the Monsters chronology
Beautiful World (1997)	Riviera (2002)	Crimes of Passion (2004)

Riviera is the 2002 studio album by American rock band Big Head Todd and the Monsters. Their first release in five years, it was issued on the band's vanity label, Big Records, and distributed by Warner Bros. Records after their contract with Giant Records expired.

== Reception ==
Editors at AllMusic rated the album 3.5 out of 5 stars, with critic Stephen Thomas Erlewine noting that the band returned to its sonic roots, resulting in "their best record in nearly a decade".

== Track listing ==
All songs written by Todd Park Mohr.

1. "Julianna" – 3:38
2. "Freedom Fighter" – 4:07
3. "Hysteria" – 4:24
4. "Again and Again" – 4:04
5. "Runaway Train" – 4:31
6. "Wishing Well" – 4:04
7. "Jet" – 4:14
8. "Secret Mission" – 4:29
9. "Gary Indiana Blues" – 3:23
10. "Riviera" – 4:01
11. "Universal Mom" – 4:45
12. "Come On" – 3:53
13. "Engine Light" – 3:04

== Personnel ==
Big Head Todd & the Monsters

- Todd Park Mohr – guitar, keyboards, vocals, engineering, production, layout design, photography
- Brian Nevin – drums, percussion, backing vocals
- Rob Squires – bass guitar, backing vocals

Additional personnel

- Karl Derfler – mixing, pre-production direction
- Brian Gardner – mastering
- John Kurzweg – drum engineering, pre-production direction
- Mary Tassone – pre-press layout
- Andy Torri – engineering, pre-production direction
- Michael Wilson – photography

== Chart performance ==
Riviera debuted at 166 on the Billboard 200 and second place on the Top Internet Album Sales chart. In the CMJ New Music Report, Riviera spent three weeks on the Retail 100, after debuted at its peak of 46th place.

== See also ==
- List of 2002 albums
