= Another Mayberry =

Studio album by Big Head Todd and the Monsters
- Released: 1989
- Studios: FastTrack, Rogue Elephant, and Coupe
- Genre: Rock
- Length: 40:36
- Label: Big
- Producers: Big Head Todd and the Monsters, John Burris

Big Head Todd and the Monsters chronology
| Another Mayberry (1989) | Midnight Radio (1990) |

Professional ratings
Review scores
| Source | Rating |
|---|---|
| AllMusic | 3/5 stars |

Another Mayberry is the first studio album by Colorado rock band Big Head Todd and the Monsters, released in 1989. The album was released on the band's own Big Records.

After the success of the band's third album and first major label effort, Sister Sweetly, Warner Bros. Records re-released Another Maybery in 1994.

== Track listing ==
All songs written by Todd Park Mohr.

1. "Flander's Fields" – 4:03
2. "Another Mayberry" – 2:51
3. "Salvation" – 4:38
4. "I Will Carry" – 3:12
5. "Blues for Annie" – 3:26
6. "Blue Water" – 3:29
7. "Geography of a Horse Dreamer" – 4:09
8. "It All Comes Down" – 2:54
9. "American Boy" – 4:20
10. "Waiting in America" – 3:36
11. "Hymn" – 3:58
