= Beileid =

EP by Bohren & der Club of Gore
- Released: 22 April 2011
- Genre: Jazz, dark ambient
- Length: 35:08
- Label: Ipecac Recordings; Wonder Records

Bohren & der Club of Gore chronology
Dolores (2008)	Beileid (2011)	Piano Nights (2014)

Beileid is an EP by jazz/ambient band Bohren & der Club of Gore, released on June 28, 2011, by Ipecac Recordings. It features a cover of the song "Catch My Heart" by German heavy metal band Warlock. This cover is also the first track by the band to feature vocals.

== Track listing ==
1. "Zombies Never Die (Blues) " – 7:31
2. "Catch My Heart" (featuring Mike Patton) – 13:16
3. "Beileid" – 14:21

== Personnel ==
- Thorsten Benning – drums
- Christoph Clöser – Fender Rhodes, vibraphone, tenor and baritone saxophone
- Morten Gass – bass, organ, vocoder, synthesizer
- Robin Rodenberg – bass
- Mike Patton – vocals
