= Rocksteady (Big Head Todd and the Monsters album) =

Studio album by Big Head Todd and the Monsters
- Released: July 20, 2010
- Recorded: 2008–10
- Genre: Rock
- Length: 43:01
- Label: Big Records
- Producers: Big Head Todd and the Monsters

Big Head Todd and the Monsters chronology
All The Love You Need (2007)	Rocksteady (2010)	Black Beehive (2014)

Rocksteady is the ninth studio album from Big Head Todd and The Monsters, released on July 20, 2010. The album's first single, "Beautiful", charted top 20 in Adult album alternative in 2010 and is available on iTunes. Glide Magazine's Doug Collette called the album "fresh in ways even the band might not expect" and the band "right in their element from the opening title track".

== Track listing ==
All tracks are written by Todd Park Mohr, except "Smokestack Lightning" by Chester Burnett and "Beast of Burden" by Mick Jagger and Keith Richards.

No.	Title	Length
1.	"Rocksteady"	4:27
2.	"Beautiful"	3:55
3.	"Muhammad Ali"	3:21
4.	"After Gold"	4:26
5.	"Happiness Is"	4:11
6.	"Back To The Garden"	4:35
7.	"Smokestack Lightning" (Howlin' Wolf cover)	3:44
8.	"I Hate It When You're Gone"	4:00
9.	"People Train"	3:27
10.	"Beast of Burden" (The Rolling Stones cover)	3:42
11.	"Fake Diamond Kind"	3:33
