= Sunset Mission =

Studio album by Bohren & der Club of Gore
- Released: 25 February 2000
- Genre: Jazz, dark ambient
- Length: 1:13:28
- Label: Wonder
- Producer: Morten Gass

Bohren & der Club of Gore chronology
Midnight Radio (1997)	Sunset Mission (2000)	Black Earth (2002)

Professional ratings
Review scores
Source	Rating
Allmusic	3.5/5 stars

Sunset Mission is the third full-length record from Bohren & der Club of Gore. It is their first album to feature sax player Christoph Clöser, more explicitly exploring jazz than earlier recordings.

The liner notes include a quote from Matt Wagner's Grendel comic book, which reads: "Alone in the comforting darkness the creature waits. As confusion reigns on this hellish stage, the deafening grind of machinery, the odious clot of chemical waste. Still, the trail of his ultimate prey leads through this steely maze to these, the addled offspring of the modern world."

== Track listing ==
1. "Prowler" – 5:03
2. "On Demon Wings" – 7:01
3. "Midnight Walker" – 7:17
4. "Street Tattoo" – 9:51
5. "Painless Steel" – 5:47
6. "Darkstalker" – 5:43
7. "Nightwolf" – 16:31
8. "Black City Skyline" – 5:50
9. "Dead End Angels" – 10:25

== Personnel ==
- Morten Gass – piano
- Christoph Clöser – tenor saxophone
- Thorsten Benning – drums
- Robin Rodenberg – bass
