= Colorado Music Hall of Fame =

Colorado music nonprofit

Colorado Music Hall of Fame (The Hall) is a nonprofit in Colorado, United States founded in 2011 with a mission to promote and support Colorado's music community.

== Inductees ==
The following is a list of musicians inducted to the Colorado Music Hall of Fame.

2011

- John Denver
- Red Rocks Amphitheatre

2012

- Barry Fey
- Flash Cadillac
- KIMN Radio
- Sugarloaf
- The Astronauts
- Harry Tuft

2013

- Judy Collins
- Chris Daniels
- Bob Lind
- Serendipity Singers

2015

- Firefall
- Manassas (featuring Stephen Stills)
- Nitty Gritty Dirt Band
- Poco

2016

- Lannie Garrett
- Glenn Miller
- Max Morath (ragtime music performer)
- Billy Murray
- Elizabeth Spencer
- Paul Whiteman

2017

- Dan Fogelberg
- Joe Walsh/Barnstorm
- Caribou Ranch recording studio
- Bill Szymczyk
- Philip Bailey, Larry Dunn, Andrew Woolfolk of Earth, Wind & Fire
- Charles Burrell
- Bill Frisell
- Ron Miles
- Dianne Reeves

2018

- John Hickenlooper
- KBCO
- Chuck Morris

2019

- Walt Conley
- Dick Weissman
- Swallow Hill Music
- The Mother Folkers
- Tommy Bolin
- Otis Taylor
- Zephyr
- Freddi & Henchi
- Wendy Lynn Kale
- Tony Spicola

2021

- eTown
- Hot Rize
- Leftover Salmon
- The String Cheese Incident
- Yonder Mountain String Band

2023

- Big Head Todd and the Monsters
- Hazel Miller
- George Morrison, Sr.

2024

- Central City Opera
- Cynthia Lawrence
- Keith Miller
- John Moriarty
- El Chapultepec and Jerry Krantz
- Greg Gisbert
- Eric Gunnison
- KUVO & Carlos Lando
- Ellyn Rucker
- Ken Walker

2025

- Jazz Aspen Snowmass & Jim Horowitz
- Nathaniel Rateliff & The Night Sweats

2026

- Widespread Panic
- Bill Bass
