= Strategem (album) =

Studio album by Big Head Todd and the Monsters
- Released: September 27, 1994
- Genre: Rock
- Length: 47:15
- Label: Giant
- Producers: Andy Torri, Big Head Todd and the Monsters

Big Head Todd and the Monsters chronology
Sister Sweetly (1993)	Strategem (1994)	Beautiful World (1997)

Professional ratings
Review scores
Source	Rating
AllMusic	2/5 stars

Strategem was the fourth studio album by Colorado rock band Big Head Todd and the Monsters, released in 1994. It was the band's second Giant Records release, following their platinum Sister Sweetly released the year before. While the album failed to match the sales and popularity of the band's previous effort, several individual tracks were positively received by reviewers, including "Kensington Line" and "Neckbreaker". Several verses on the album were inspired by Buddhist koans.

The band recorded the album in an empty theater in Boulder, Colorado, and attempted to return to a more indie music sound in the wake of their more commercial-sounding effort in "Sister Sweetly".

"Strategem" was a deliberate misspelling by the band of "stratagem", used in the album title and also found in the song title "Strategem", and in the lyrics of that song: "Here I stand by lovely strategem."

== Track listing ==
All songs written by Todd Park Mohr

1. "Kensington Line" – 3:19
2. "Strategem" – 4:25
3. "Wearing Only Flowers" – 4:43
4. "Neckbreaker" – 3:57
5. "Magdelina" – 4:55
6. "Angel Leads Me On – 5:01
7. "In the Morning" – 3:56
8. "Candle 99" – 4:28
9. "Greyhound" – 2:56
10. "Poor Miss" – 4:25
11. "Shadowlands" – 5:10

== Personnel ==
- Todd Park Mohr – vocals, guitar, piano
- Rob Squires – bass, background vocals
- Brian Nevin – drums, percussion, background vocals
- Nick Forster – steel guitar, slide guitar
- Al Laughlin – organ
- Hazel Miller – background vocals
- Big Head Todd and the Monsters – producers, engineers
- Andy Torri – producer, engineer
- Andy Wallace – mixing
- Howie Weinberg – mastering
- Steve Sisco – mixing assistant
- Kevin Clock – "transfers"
- Mickey Houlihan – "sounds"
- Janet Levinson – design
- Stephen McNamara – digital editing
- Jeff Shuey – digital editing, "transfers"
- Simeon Soffer – photography
