= Gore Motel =

Studio album by Bohren & der Club of Gore
- Released: 1993
- Recorded: 1992
- Genre: Dark ambient, post-rock, jazz
- Length: 1:14:56
- Label: Epistrophy
- Producer: Morten Gass

Bohren & der Club of Gore chronology
Gore Motel (1993)	Midnight Radio (1995)

Gore Motel is the first studio album from Bohren & der Club of Gore. Gore Motel found the band focusing more on minimalistic, ambient, guitar, and bass guitar–driven songs rather than the "dark jazz" that they would be known for later in their career.

== Track listing ==
1. "Die Nahtanznummer, Teil 2" - 6:32
2. "Sabbat Schwarzer Highway" - 8:15
3. "Gore Motel" - 6:44
4. "Dandys lungern durch die Nacht" - 5:04
5. "Dangerflirt mit der Schlägerbitch" - 6:20
6. "Conway Twitty zieh mit mir" - 6:01
7. "Die Fulci Nummer" - 4:56
8. "Der Maggot Tango" - 4:15
9. "Texas Keller" - 4:42
10. "Thrash Altenessen" - 4:34
11. "Cairo Keller" - 8:59
12. "Gore Musik" - 7:55

== Personnel ==
- Thorsten Benning - drums
- Morten Gass - guitar, piano, mellotron
- Robin Rodenberg - bass
- Reiner Henseleit - guitar
