= Geisterfaust =

Studio album by Bohren & der Club of Gore
- Released: 2 May 2005
- Genre: Jazz, dark ambient
- Length: 58:52
- Label: Wonder
- Producer: Morten Gass

Bohren & der Club of Gore chronology
Black Earth (2002)	Geisterfaust (2005)	Dolores (2008)

Professional ratings
Review scores
Source	Rating
Allmusic	3.5/5 stars
Pitchfork Media	(7.6/10)

Geisterfaust is the fifth album by the Jazz/Ambient band Bohren & der Club of Gore. The title translates to "ghostfist" and refers to a booze the band created.

== Track listing ==
1. "Zeigefinger" - 20:29
2. "Daumen" - 8:07
3. "Ringfinger" - 10:23
4. "Mittelfinger" - 12:10
5. "Kleiner Finger" - 7:47

== Personnel ==
- Thorsten Benning – drums and percussion
- Christoph Clöser – Fender Rhodes keyboard, vibraharp, and saxophone
- Morten Gass – 8-string bass, volume pedal
- Robin Rodenberg – double bass and fretless bass
