= Black Earth (Bohren & der Club of Gore album) =

Studio album by Bohren & der Club of Gore
- Released: 28 October 2002
- Genre: Jazz, dark ambient
- Length: 70:55
- Label: Wonder; Ipecac
- Producer: Morten Gass

Bohren & der Club of Gore chronology
Sunset Mission (2000)	Black Earth (2002)	Geisterfaust (2005)

Professional ratings
Review scores
Source	Rating
Allmusic	4.5/5 stars
Dusted Magazine	(favorable)
PopMatters	(very favorable)

Black Earth is the fourth album by the jazz/ambient band Bohren & der Club of Gore. Black Earth was re-released on the American label Ipecac Recordings in 2004, increasing the band's exposure in the United States. The record has been re-released in 2016 by PIAS Recordings.

== Track listing ==
All songs written by Bohren & der Club of Gore.

1. "Midnight Black Earth" – 8:45
2. "Crimson Ways" – 6:39
3. "Maximum Black" – 7:38
4. "Vigilante Crusade" – 7:30
5. "Destroying Angels" – 7:10
6. "Grave Wisdom" – 6:32
7. "Constant Fear" – 6:27
8. "Skeletal Remains" – 7:58
9. "The Art of Coffins" – 12:04

== Personnel ==
- Morten Gass: Piano, Fender Rhodes, Mellotron
- Christoph Clöser: Piano, Fender Rhodes, Saxophone
- Robin Rodenberg: Bass
- Thorsten Benning: Drums, Percussion

== Production ==
- Produced & Engineered By Morten Gass
- Mixed By Bohren & der Club of Gore
