= Harry Tuft =

Folk musician

Harry M. Tuft (born 1935) is a noted figure in the world of folk music, particularly in the state of Colorado during the American Folk Music Revival. Tuft is the founder and former owner of the Denver Folklore Center, as well as a musician.

== Biography ==
Harry Tuft was born in 1935 and raised in Philadelphia. His father was a doctor and his mother was a psychologist. Tuft attended West Philadelphia High School. Tuft graduated from Dartmouth College with a degree in philosophy and two years of post-graduate work in architecture at the University of Pennsylvania. Tuft grew up singing and playing a series of instruments including the clarinet, ukulele, and baritone uke.

In the 1950s Tuft became interested in folk music and started playing a six-string guitar. He began performing for youth groups and frequenting Philadelphia's popular folk music coffeehouse, the Gilded Cage. Philadelphia's lively folk scene provided the setting for Harry's first ventures into public singing. While playing Sunday Hootenannies, or "hoots", at the Gilded Cage, Tuft met Dick Weissman, a talented banjo and guitar player, and took an interest in folk music, particularly the folk group The Weavers.

In 1960, Tuft made a trip to visit Weissman in New York City and saw firsthand the folk culture of Greenwich Village. One of the first places Weissman took Tuft was Izzy Young's Folklore Center. Later in 1960, Tuft and Weissman traveled to the Old Town School of Folk Music in Chicago, and then on to Colorado. Weissman headed west to California while Tuft got a job at a restaurant, the Holy Cat, in Georgetown, Colorado. Tuft's job included waiting and busing tables, bartending, washing dishes, and janitorial duties. Tuft also performed at venues such as the Limelite in Aspen, Colorado.

Tuft's stay in Georgetown also allowed him to pursue his passion for skiing. While working at the Holy Cat, Tuft met Hal Neustaedter, who was the owner of "The Exodus", a premiere folk club in Denver, Colorado. Neustedter suggested to Tuft that he should look into starting a folklore center in Denver. In 1961, Tuft moved to the West Coast, briefly driving a cab for Sausalito Taxi Company while looking for opportunities to perform. Tuft also met up with Weissman in California, who was now performing with the folk group The Journeymen. While in California, Tuft performed at venues such as The Fox and the Hound in San Francisco. Tuft returned to the East Coast, and with further encouragement from Izzy Young, he decided to open a folklore center in Denver, Colorado. Tuft's center would combine the merchandising aspect of Izzy's Folklore Center while also providing the teaching and performing aspect of the Old Town School of Folk Music. In December 1961, Tuft used his life savings of $900 to buy stock from Izzy Young, loaded his 1951 Dodge truck, and headed to Denver.

== Denver Folklore Center ==
Tuft opened the Denver Folklore Center on March 12, 1962, at 608 E. 17th Ave. in Denver's Swallow Hill district. The Denver Folklore Center was a store for instruments, records, books, and everything related to folk music, including music lessons. "Hoots" also took place on Sundays. Denver Folklore Center resembled the rustic, old, and antique look of the New York Folklore Center. It became one of the nation's focal points during the American Folk Music Revival during the 1960s, and it was consistently mentioned in articles and columns in folk music publications such as Sing Out!, the official magazine of the folk movement during the folk revival. The Denver Folklore Center presented concerts by musicians such as Elizabeth Cotten, Joan Baez, Doc Watson, Muddy Waters, Ramblin' Jack Elliott, Mike Seeger, Taj Mahal, Ian & Sylvia, The Mamas and the Papas, and the first ever performance of Arlo Guthrie and Pete Seeger, among many others.

The Denver Folklore Center also hosted performances, hoots, and open mic nights in a performance space next to the store. The Rev. Gary Davis was just one of the artists that performed there. It was also a regular stop for national acts performing in Denver, or traveling from Chicago to Los Angeles, such as Bob Dylan. The Denver Folklore Center sign in book includes signatures from Jim Morrison and Frank Zappa, among many other national artists and music icons. The Denver Folklore Center became a hippie hangout in the late 1960s. In the 1970s folk music's popularity and store profits declined. In the late 1970s, the nonprofit organization Swallow Hill Music Association was created to reorganize and relieve expenses related to costs associated with concert promotions done by the Denver Folklore Center. In 1980, Tuft was forced to close his store after losing the lease after the property owners sold to developers. The Denver Folklore Center name and stock were sold to employee Rick Kerby, who reopened the store at a new location. The new location also included the Swallow Hill Music Association. Tuft continued to give guitar lessons and served on Swallow Hill's board of directors. In 1983, Tuft returned as owner of the Folklore Center, paid its outstanding debts, and then closed the store.

== The Denver Folklore Center – Revisited ==
After working various jobs, Tuft reopened the Denver Folklore Center in March 1993 at 1893 S. Pearl St. The new location remains a mecca for local musicians both young and old. Tuft has maintained an active performing career both as a solo artist and together with other performers. Most notably, for over 40 years, he performed with Steve Abbott and Jack Stanesco as part of the folk trio Grubstake. Tuft has performed hundreds of shows at clubs large and small, and Grubstake opened for the Nitty Gritty Dirt Band and Willie Nelson at Red Rocks Amphitheatre.

== Retirement ==
On August 16, 2016, Tuft retired as owner of the Denver Folklore Center, desiring time to devote to performing and other pursuits. Ownership of the Denver Folklore Center was transferred to Saul Rosenthal and Claude Brachfeld, friends of Tuft who intend to retain the long-time staff and the ideals that have kept the business alive and well and an iconic part of the folk music landscape for nearly seven decades.

== Awards and recognition ==
- On February 12, 2012, Tuft was inducted into the Colorado Music Hall of Fame. Other inductees include John Denver and Judy Collins.
- On October 17, 2016, Denver City Council Proclamation 16-0990 was passed recognizing Tuft's extraordinary contribution to Denver's music scene and declaring October 17, 2016, Harry Tuft Day.

== See also ==
- American folk music revival
- American folk music
- Folk music
- Roots revival
