= Dolores (album) =

Studio album by Bohren & der Club of Gore
- Released: 10 October 2008
- Genre: Jazz, dark ambient
- Length: 58:28
- Label: PIAS Recordings; Ipecac Recordings (IPC-108) (US)
- Producer: Bohren & der Club of Gore

Bohren & der Club of Gore chronology
Geisterfaust (2005)	Dolores (2008)	Beileid (2011)

Dolores is the sixth album by the jazz/ambient band Bohren & der Club of Gore.

Professional ratings
Review scores
Source	Rating
Drowned in Sound	(8/10)
Pitchfork Media	(8.0/10.0)

== Track listing ==
All tracks are written by Christoph Clöser and Morten Gass.

No.	Title	Length
1.	"Staub"	7:51
2.	"Karin"	3:37
3.	"Schwarze Biene (Black Maja)"	8:11
4.	"Unkerich"	5:31
5.	"Still am Tresen"	3:59
6.	"Welk"	6:19
7.	"Von Schnäbeln"	3:57
8.	"Orgelblut"	6:13
9.	"Faul"	5:56
10.	"Welten"	6:54

== Personnel ==
Band members

- Thorsten Benning – drums
- Christoph Clöser – Fender Rhodes, vibraphone, tenor- and baritone saxophone, recording and engineering
- Morten Gass – bass, organ, vocoder, synthesizer, recording and engineering
- Robin Rodenberg – bass

Other personnel

- Jorg Föllert – artwork and typography
- Melanie Höner – artwork and drawing
- Marcus Schmickler – mixing and mastering
