= Bohren & der Club of Gore =

German ambient/jazz band

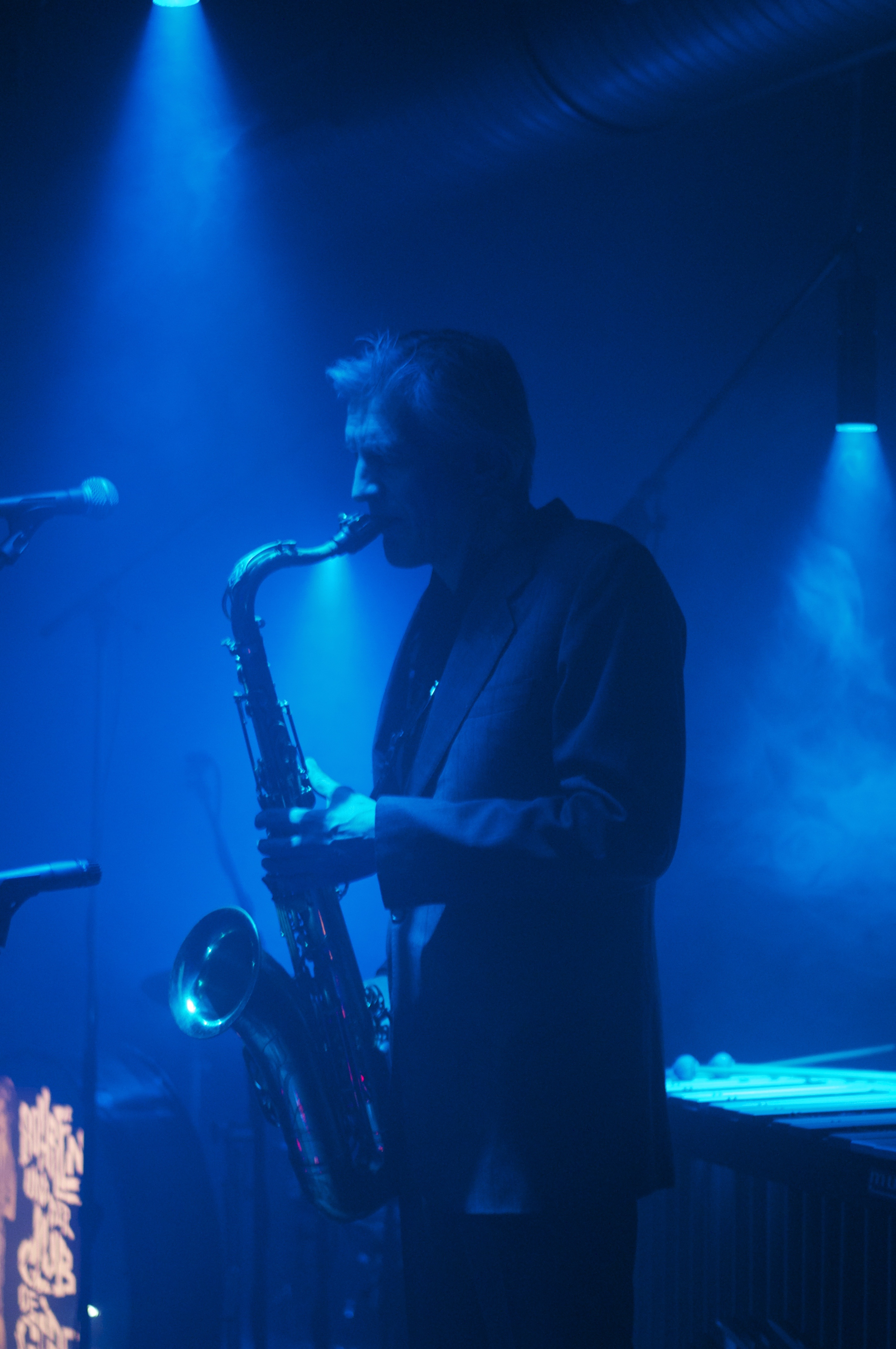

Background information
- Also known as: Bohren (1988–1993); Bohren und der Club of Gore (1993–1995)
- Origin: Mülheim an der Ruhr, Germany
- Genres: Dark jazz, ambient
- Years active: 1992–present
- Labels: PIAS Recordings, Ipecac Recordings
- Members: Morten Gass; Robin Rodenberg; Christoph Clöser
- Past members: Reiner Henseleit; Thorsten Benning
- Website: bohrenundderclubofgore.com

Bohren & der Club of Gore is a German dark jazz / ambient band from Mülheim, North Rhine-Westphalia.

== History ==
The band was formed in 1988 in Mülheim an der Ruhr, Germany by Thorsten Benning, Morten Gass, Robin Rodenberg and Reiner Henseleit. Originally, group members started out playing in various hardcore punk bands such as 7 Inch Boots (all members since 1988) and Chronical Diarrhoea (Thorsten Benning and Reiner Henseleit). In 1992, they produced a crossover of jazz and ambient, which they self-described as an "unholy ambient mixture of slow jazz ballads, Black Sabbath doom and down-tuned Autopsy sounds". In 1993, the band expanded their name to Bohren & der Club of Gore as a tribute to the Dutch group Gore, whose work had inspired them to pursue instrumental music.

Henseleit left the band in 1996 and was replaced by Christoph Clöser in 1997, replacing the guitar with a saxophone at the same time. Thorsten Benning departed the group in late 2015. Since his departure, the remaining members have continued to work as a trio.

== Members ==
=== Current members ===
- Morten Gass – electric guitar (1992–1997), vocals (1992–1993), piano, electric organ, synthesizer, Moog synthesizer, mellotron, Fender Rhodes electric piano (1997–present), 8-string bass (2004–present), vocoder (2007–2008), baritone guitar (2013–present), drums (2016–present)
- Robin Rodenberg – bass guitar, double bass (1992–present), drums (2016–present)
- Christoph Clöser – saxophones (1997–present), piano (2001–present), Fender Rhodes electric piano (2001–present), vibraphone (2004–present), drums (2016–present)

=== Former members ===
- Reiner Henseleit – electric guitars (1992–1996)
- Thorsten Benning – drums, percussion (1992–2015)

== Discography ==
=== Albums ===
- 1993 – Gore Motel
- 1995 – Midnight Radio
- 2000 – Sunset Mission
- 2002 – Black Earth
- 2005 – Geisterfaust
- 2008 – Dolores
- 2014 – Piano Nights
- 2020 – Patchouli Blue

=== EPs ===
- 1994 – Bohren & der Club of Gore
- 1995 – Schwarzer Sabbat für Dean Martin (split with Wald)
- 2009 – Mitleid Lady
- 2011 – Beileid

=== Demos ===
- 1992 – Langspielkassette (as Bohren)
- 1993 – Luder, Samba und Tavernen

=== Compilations ===
- 2016 – Bohren for Beginners

=== Compilation appearances ===
- 2022 – "Plateau" on The Others (Lustmord remix/covers album, 2022)

== See also ==
- List of ambient music artists
