= Beautiful World (Big Head Todd and the Monsters album) =

Studio album by Big Head Todd and the Monsters
- Released: February 11, 1997
- Recorded: 1996
- Genre: Rock
- Length: 52:17
- Label: Revolution
- Producer: Jerry Harrison

Big Head Todd and the Monsters chronology
Strategem (1994)	Beautiful World (1997)	Live Monsters (1998)

Singles from Beautiful World
- 1. "Resignation Superman" Released: 1997; 2. "Boom Boom" Released: 1998

Professional ratings
Review scores
Source	Rating
AllMusic	3/5 stars

Beautiful World is the fifth album by the Colorado rock band Big Head Todd and the Monsters, released in 1997. The album produced two hit singles: "Resignation Superman" and a cover of John Lee Hooker's "Boom Boom".

== Critical reception ==
AllMusic wrote that "the Monsters jam with an expert grace throughout the record, particularly with guests John Lee Hooker and Bernie Worrell, and producer Jerry Harrison helps keep things focused."

== Track listing ==
All tracks are written by Todd Park Mohr except "Boom Boom" written by John Lee Hooker.

Beautiful World track listing
No.	Title	Length
1.	"Resignation Superman"	4:03
2.	"Caroline"	5:55
3.	"Crazy Mary"	4:45
4.	"Helpless"	4:02
5.	"Tower"	5:18
6.	"Please Don't Tell Her"	4:08
7.	"Beautiful World"	4:24
8.	"True Lady"	3:16
9.	"Heart of Wilderness"	3:56
10.	"If You Can't Slow Down"	4:48
11.	"Boom Boom"	3:37
12.	"These Days Without You"	4:05
Total length:		52:17

== Personnel ==
- Todd Park Mohr – vocals, guitar, keyboards, saxophone, harmonica
- Brian Nevin – drums, percussion, vocals
- Rob Squires – bass guitar, vocals
- Jeremy Lawton – keyboards, pedal steel guitar, vocals
- Jerry Harrison – piano, arranger, clavinet, producer
- Corey Mauser – organ, piano, clavinet
- Hazel Miller – vocals, backing vocals
- Arlene Newson – backing vocals
- Susan Voelz – violin
- Bernie Worrell – organ, clavinet

Technical personnel

- Matt Byrne – general assistance
- Daniel Chase – digital editing
- Mike Cresswell – assistant engineer
- Karl Derfler – engineer
- Larimie Garcia – design
- Jack Hersca – mixing assistant
- Billy Gibbons – guitar
- John Lee Hooker – vocals
- Màickey Hoolihan – general assistance
- Ted Jensen – mastering
- Warren Latimer – assistant engineer
- Janet Levinson – art direction, design
- Tom Lord-Alge – mixing
- Kent Matcke – assistant engineer
- Matt Need – general assistance
- Michael Perfitt – assistant engineer
- Andy Torri – pre-production, general assistance
