= Big Head Todd and the Monsters =

American rock band

Big Head Todd and The Monsters
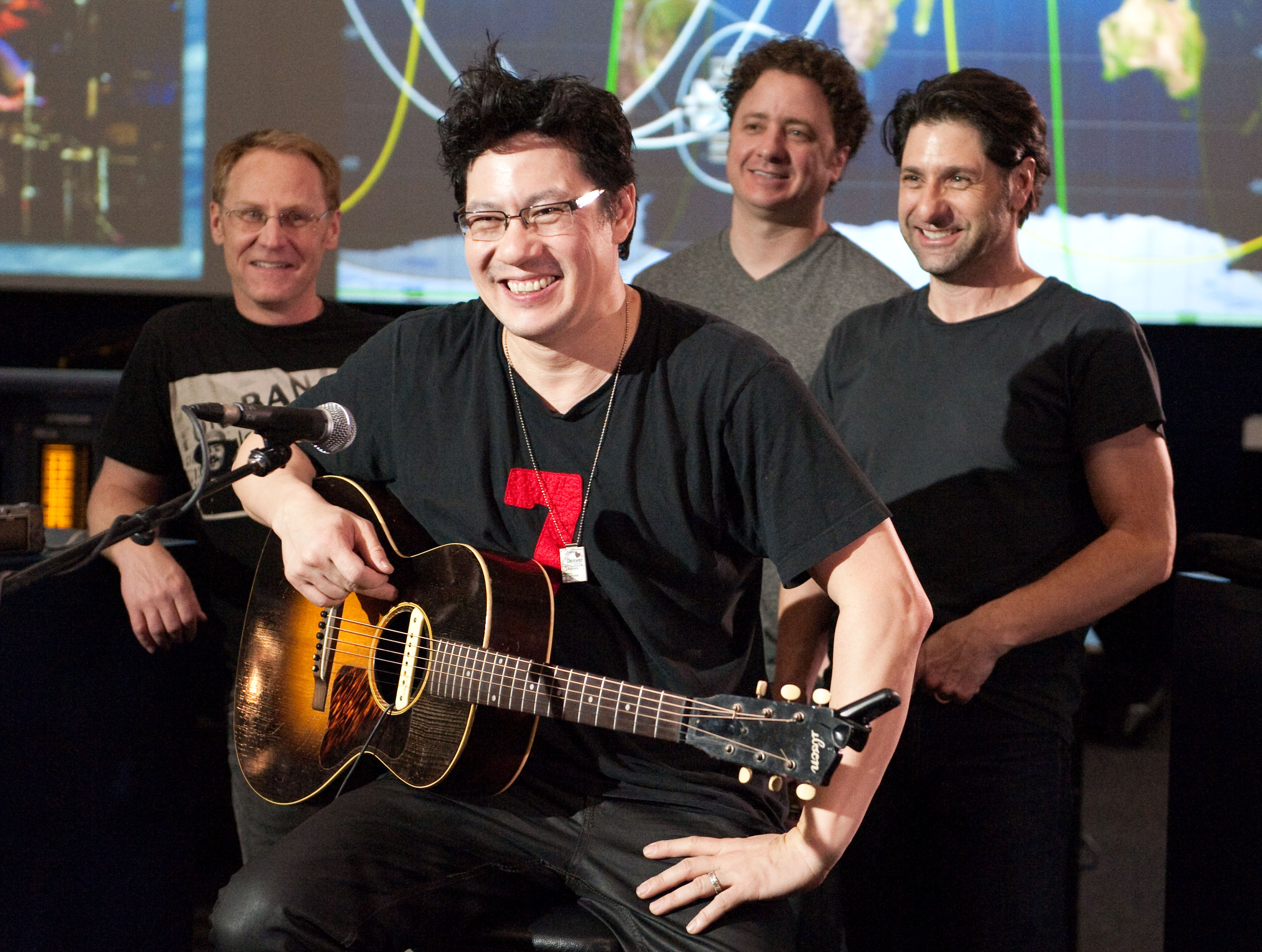
- A March 2011 live performance by the band was the first time a shuttle crew had been awakened live from Mission Control, Houston.

Background information
- Origin: Boulder, Colorado, U.S.
- Genres: Alternative rock; blues rock; country rock; jam band
- Years active: 1986–present
- Labels: Big; Giant; Reprise; Warner Bros.
- Members: Todd Park Mohr; Brian Nevin; Rob Squires; Jeremy Lawton
- Past members: Corey Mauser
- Website: bigheadtodd.com

Big Head Todd and The Monsters is a rock band formed by Todd Park Mohr, Brian Nevin, and Rob Squires in Colorado in 1986. Their 1993 major label debut Sister Sweetly went platinum in the United States. The band developed a sizable live following, especially in the Mountain States of the United States.

== Career ==
=== Early life and career ===
The trio attended Columbine High School together. Mohr went to Colorado State University in Fort Collins, Colorado and transferred to the University of Colorado to join Nevin and Squires. The three had their first gig in 1986, at a college party at the University of Colorado. Soon after that they began touring bars and clubs in Denver, Fort Collins, and Boulder as Big Head Todd and the Monsters in 1987. The band soon built up a following throughout Colorado and the surrounding states. They toured extensively throughout the Mountain States and West Coast of the United States in their van, dubbed The Colonel, driving more than 400,000 miles.

=== 1986-2005 ===
In 1989, the band formed Big Records and released its first album Another Mayberry that same year. Midnight Radio was released the following year and featured artwork from Chris Mars of The Replacements. By 1993, Big Head Todd and the Monsters had developed a considerable live following across the United States. Their first live album Big Head Todd and the Monsters Live was recorded at the H.O.R.D.E. Festival in 1993.

The group signed with Giant Records in 1993 and recorded Sister Sweetly with Prince associate David Z producing. The album went platinum spawning three singles which made the rock charts, including "Bittersweet," "Broken Hearted Savior", and "Circle."

Mohr produced the next album, Strategem, released in 1994. It reached number 30 on the Billboard 200 but did not sell as well as its predecessors. Their song "In the Morning" was featured in the 1994 film Blown Away. The band contributed "Tangerine" to the 1995 Led Zeppelin tribute album Encomium: A Tribute to Led Zeppelin.

Jerry Harrison, formerly of Talking Heads, produced the next album, Beautiful World, released in 1997. John Lee Hooker was recording an album in the same studio and played with the band on a version of his best-known song "Boom Boom". Squires described the recording of the track on the band's website. "Hooker has just this incredible presence. He walked into the room, and everyone was intimidated, including our producer and the people who work in the studio." Bernie Worrell, formerly of P-Funk, played some keyboards on the album's title track "Beautiful World". Corey Mauser filled out the other key parts on the album. Two hit singles from the albums made the rock charts, "Boom Boom" and "Resignation Superman." The Live Monsters album followed in 1998.

In 2002, the group released the follow-up studio album Riviera. As Giant Records had closed its doors, the self-produced album was released through Big Records with distribution through Warner Music. Crimes of Passion was released in 2004 with Sanctuary Records distributing it. Another live album Live at the Fillmore was released in 2004.

In 2005, the group joined the growing trend of Internet-based music sales by releasing the single "Blue Sky" exclusively on iTunes. The song was written at the request of crewmembers of the Space Shuttle Discovery for their STS-114 Return to Flight mission in 2005, the first mission after the Columbia disaster. "Blue Sky" was written and performed as a tribute to all the people involved in the American space program. The song was inspired by NASA's space shuttle program and by Eileen Collins, the commander of the STS-114. The song was used as Senator Hillary Clinton's presidential campaign song in 2008 and the introduction of Clinton in her keynote address to the Democratic National Convention in 2008. A live rendition of "Blue Sky" was also performed acoustically on March 8, 2011, at Johnson Space Center as the first live version of a wake-up call to Space Shuttle Discovery during the STS-133 mission. "Blue Sky" was the song played for the live wake-up call because it received the most votes for a song contest for NASA

=== 2007-present ===
In June 2007, the band recorded their annual charity show to raise money for autism research at the Red Rocks Amphitheatre in Colorado. The recordings were sold on USB flash drives at the merchandise stands after the performance.

The band toured in the summer of 2008 in support of the July release of their eighth studio album, All The Love You Need. In 2010, Big Head Todd and the Monsters returned to the studio to record Rocksteady. It featured covers of "Beast of Burden" as originally recorded by The Rolling Stones and "Smokestack Lightning", written by Howlin' Wolf.

The band returned to the studio again in 2011 to record a new project under the name Big Head Blues Club. The album 100 Years of Robert Johnson celebrated the songs of the late blues singer and musician Robert Johnson. The Big Head Todd and the Monsters members were accompanied by B. B. King, Charlie Musselwhite, Cedric Burnside, David "Honeyboy" Edwards, Hubert Sumlin, Ruthie Foster, and Lightnin' Malcolm. Big Head Todd and the Monsters have also played shows under the name Big Head Blues Club and have invited some of the other musicians featured on the album to perform with them.

They performed in the Denver Broncos Super Bowl 50 Championship Parade and in Indianapolis at the Vogue on February 9, 2016, using the Instagram hashtag #denver2indy to celebrate the dual event.

On November 3, 2017, the band released its eleventh studio album, New World Arisin'. The band released the singles "Crush" on November 13, 2023, "Her Way Out" on January 8, 2024, and "Thunderbird" on March 29, 2024.

== Lineup ==
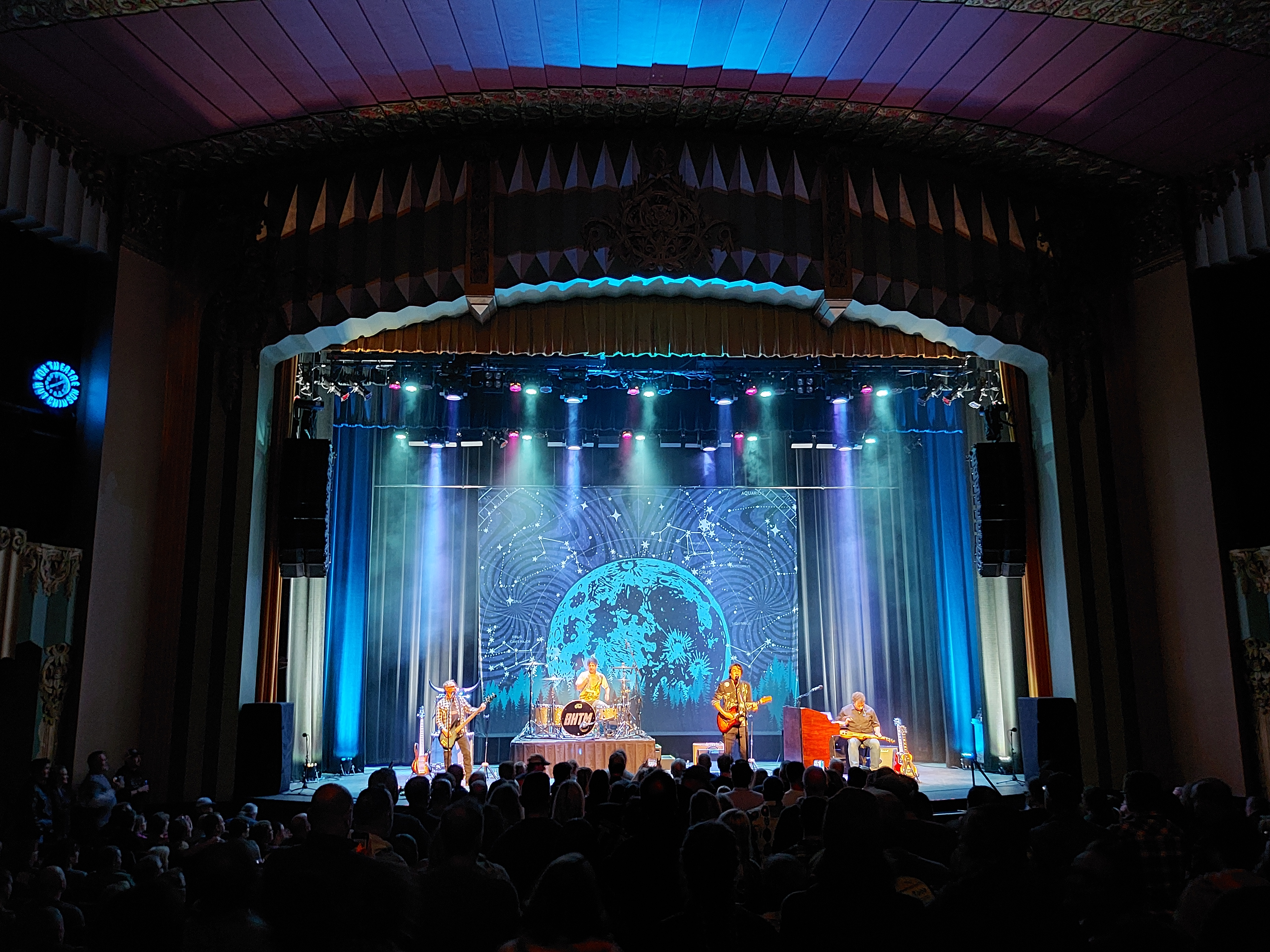
The band performing in 2022

- Jeremy Lawton – keyboards, pedal steel guitar, vocals
- Todd Park Mohr – vocals, guitar, keyboards, saxophone, harmonica
- Brian Nevin– drums, percussion, vocals
- Rob Squires – bass guitar, vocals

Touring:

- Hazel Miller – vocals

== Discography ==
=== Studio albums ===
- Another Mayberry (Giant Records, 1989)
- Midnight Radio (Giant Records, 1990)
- Sister Sweetly (Rhino/Warner Records, 1993)
- Strategem (Giant Records, 1994)
- Beautiful World (Revolution Records, 1997)
- Riviera (Warner Bros., 2002)
- Crimes of Passion (Big Records, 2004)
- All the Love You Need (Big Records, 2007)
- Rocksteady (2010)
- 100 Years of Robert Johnson (2011) [credited to artist Big Head Blues Club]
- Black Beehive (Shout! Factory Records, 2014)
- Way Down Inside: Songs of Willie Dixon (Big Records, 2016) [credited to artist Big Head Blues Club]
- New World Arisin' (Big Records, 2017)
- Her Way Out (Big Records, 2024)

=== Live albums ===
- Live Monsters (Giant/Reprise, 1998)
- Live at the Fillmore (2004)
- Red Rocks (2009)
- Live at Red Rocks (2015)
- Live at the Belly Up (2020)
- We're Gonna Play It Anyway – Red Rocks 2020 (Big Records, 2020)
- 40 Live (2025)

=== Compilation albums ===
- From the Archives (Big Records, 2007) [outtakes album]

=== Charting albums ===
The following albums have charted on the Billboard album charts:

- Sister Sweetly – No. 1 Billboard Heatseeker; No. 117 Billboard 200
- Strategem – No. 30 Billboard 200
- Beautiful World – No. 54 Billboard 200
- Riviera – No. 166 Billboard 200; No. 2 Internet Albums
- Crimes of Passion – No. 253 Internet Albums

=== Charting singles ===
Year	Title	Chart positions		Album
Year	Title	US Modern Rock	US Mainstream Rock	Album
1993	"Bittersweet"	–	14	Sister Sweetly
1993	"Broken Hearted Savior"	–	9	Sister Sweetly
1993	"Circle"	–	21	Sister Sweetly
1997	"Resignation Superman"	38	13	Beautiful World
1998	"Boom Boom"	–	29	Beautiful World

=== Other appearances ===
Year	Song	Album
1995	"Tangerine"	Encomium: A Tribute to Led Zeppelin
