= Midnight Radio (Big Head Todd and the Monsters album) =

Live album by Big Head Todd and the Monsters
- Released: 1990
- Recorded: March 8 – May 4, 1990
- Venues: Boulder Theater, Boulder, Colorado; Cabaret Metro, Chicago, Illinois; KVSC, St. Cloud, Minnesota; Matt's Living Room, Indianapolis, Indiana
- Genre: Rock
- Length: 63:16
- Label: Big Records
- Producers: John Burris, Andy Torri, and Big Head Todd and The Monsters

Big Head Todd and the Monsters chronology
Another Mayberry (1989)	Midnight Radio (1990)	Sister Sweetly (1993)

Professional ratings
Review scores
Source	Rating
Allmusic	4/5 stars

Midnight Radio is the second studio album by Big Head Todd and the Monsters that was released in 1990.

The album was released on the band's own label, Big Records, which released their debut album Another Mayberry. Artwork for the album was created by Chris Mars of The Replacements. Songs from the album, including an earlier version of their hit "Bittersweet", were recorded at live shows, sound checks, and basement jam sessions.

After the success of Sister Sweetly, Warner Bros. Records re-released Midnight Radio in 1994.

== Track listing ==
All songs written by Todd Park Mohr

1. "Vincent of Jersey" – 1:13
2. "The Leaving Song" – 4:26
3. "Dinner with Ivan" – 4:34
4. "Bittersweet" – 6:14
5. "The Moose Song" – 6:18
6. "Cold Blooded" – 1:49
7. "Soul Children" – 4:35
8. "Love Betsy" – 6:03
9. "Midnight Radio" – 6:01
10. "City on Fire" – 3:42
11. "Monument in Green" – 7:07
12. "Ann Arbor Grandfather" – 3:58
13. "Elvis" – 6:53
14. "Untitled" – 0:31

== Personnel ==
- Todd Park Mohr – guitar, harmonica, vocals
- Rob Squires – bass guitar, background vocals
- Brian Nevin – drums, percussion, background vocals

Production

- Andy Torri – engineer, producer
- John Burns – producer
- John Burris – engineer, producer
- Chris Mars – artwork
