= Swallow Hill Music Association =

Non profit organisation

Coordinates: 39.667721°N 104.986703°W

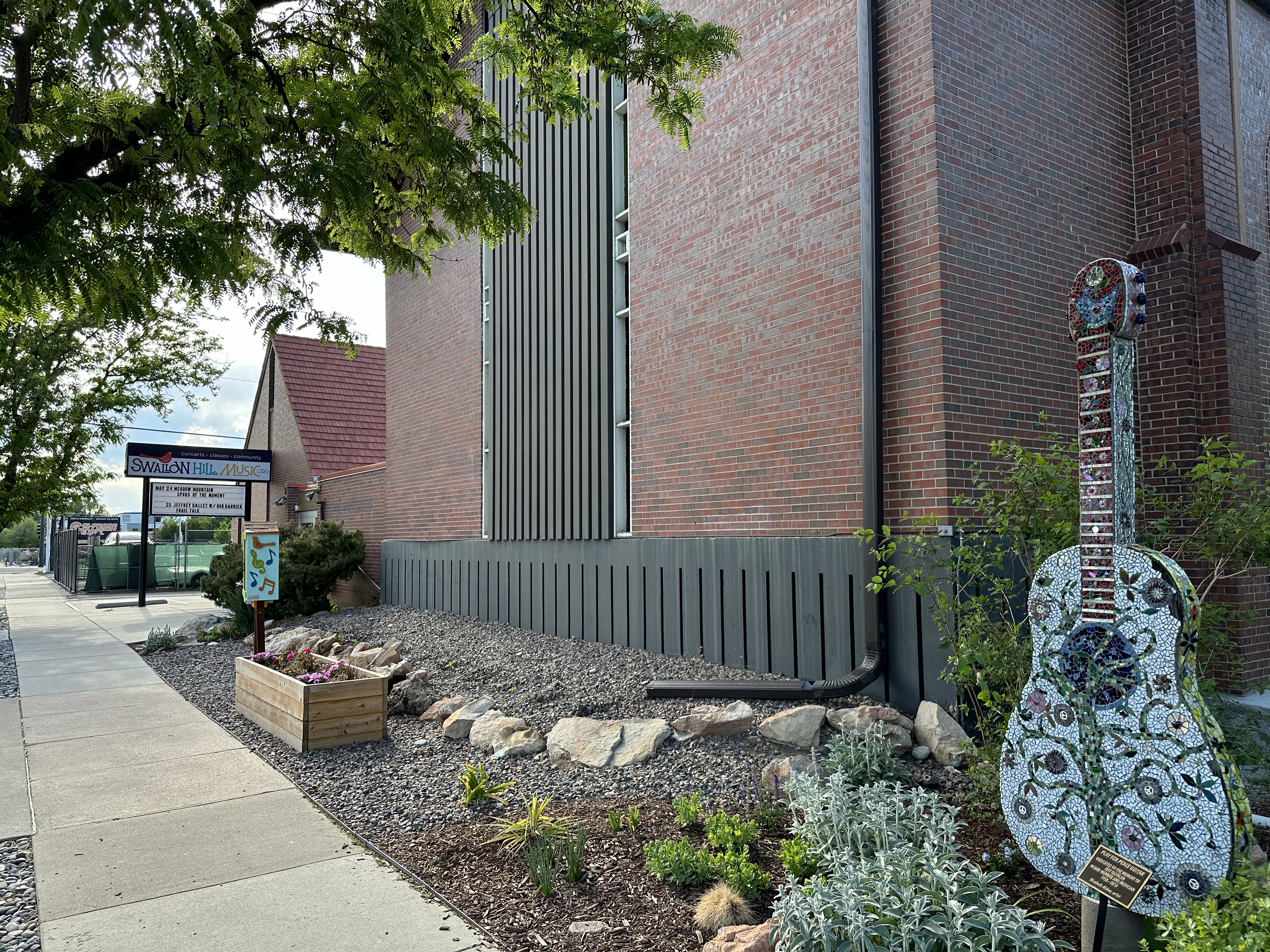
Guitar sculpture near entrance of Swallow Hill Music

Swallow Hill Music is a Denver, Colorado based non-profit organization dedicated to promoting and preserving roots, acoustic and folk music. The school is inspired by the Old Town School of Folk Music in Chicago. Swallow Hill hosts hundreds of concerts a year ranging from national acts, such as Sheryl Crow and Josh Ritter, to many talented local artists and former students.

== History ==
In 1962, Harry Tuft created the Denver Folklore Center in the Swallow Hill neighborhood of Denver, Colorado. The DFC quickly became the place to be, and in no time grew to be one square block. It included a music store, repair shop, music store, and concert hall.

In 1971, the Denver Folklore Center Concert Hall was built and through most of the 70s experienced exceptional success. The concert hall brought in artists like Taj Mahal, Ry Cooder, Bonnie Raitt, Bette White and many others, establishing a solid reputation to a business that had already been acclaimed by many. The late Rocky Mountain News can be quoted as calling the DFC “a place of good reputation among artists in many other cities.”

Unfortunately during the late 70s the neighborhood that surrounded the DFC began to decline dramatically. Tuft and many of the centers supporters got together to come up with a solution that would help support local folk music and the artists that inhabit it. This solution is now known as the non-profit Swallow Hill Music Association. This new organization would soon relieve the DFC of both the concert hall and music school.

In the 80s, Swallow Hill and the DFC made the move from the old location to a new location at 440 South Broadway. One problem with the new complex was there was not enough space to home a concert hall. Therefore, Swallow Hill rented numerous concert venues around the Denver area to accommodate their concerts. Another big moment during this era for Swallow Hill was the formation of the first newsletter titled Simple Gifts.

During the 90s, Swallow Hill drastically expanded in a very short amount of time. The organization began the decade remodeling their new Pearl Street building, forming their first choir, Thursday night jams, and the new Folkathon.

As their school and opportunities began to cover more ground, so did the population of supporters and customers. Soon the new Pearl Street building could no longer hold the capacity of people joining the organization. Thus their current home at 71 East Yale was opened to the public on the day of the organizations 20th anniversary.

== Julie Davis School of Music ==
The Swallow Hill Music school was founded in 1979. In 2002, Swallow Hill Music made the decision to honor one of their most inspiring of colleagues, Julie Davis, by naming the music school after her. Davis became heavily involved in improving the school in 1984, and served as the director from 1986 to 1995. Currently, the school hosts 40,000 students a year and has classes for just about every level, genre, and age group.

== Board of directors ==
=== Executive committee ===
- Walt DeHaven, Chair
- Kyle Harris, Treasurer
- Jim Leonard, Secretary

=== Board of directors ===
Trevor Emery, Walt DeHaven, Lori Fox, Grace Hanover, Kyle Harris, Jim Leonard, George Lyford, Gavin O’Toole, Dave Ratner, Rob Silk, Tracy Zabel
