= Sister Sweetly =

Studio album by Big Head Todd and the Monsters
- Released: 1993
- Recorded: June–August 1992
- Studios: Paisley Park, Chanhassen, Minnesota, US
- Genre: Rock
- Length: 48:35
- Label: Giant
- Producer: David Z

Big Head Todd and the Monsters chronology
Midnight Radio (1990)	Sister Sweetly (1993)	Strategem (1994)

Singles from Lost in Love
- 1. "Bittersweet" Released: 1993; 2. "Broken Hearted Savior" Released: 1993; 3. "Circle" Released: 1993

Sister Sweetly is the third album by the Colorado rock band Big Head Todd and the Monsters, released in 1993. It was the band's first album with Giant Records. Sister Sweetly sold more than 1,000,000 copies, going platinum.

The album was on the charts for more than a year, but never hit the top half of the Billboard 200, peaking at number 117. The first single was "Broken Hearted Savior". The band supported the album by touring with 4 Non Blondes.

== Production ==
The album was produced by David Z. All of its songs were written by frontman Todd Park Mohr.

== Critical reception ==
Professional ratings
Review scores
Source	Rating
AllMusic	4.5/5 stars
Calgary Herald	C

Trouser Press called the album "a revelation," writing that "by taking on mostly shorter songs, Mohr forces his writing to be tighter and more economical." The Calgary Herald deemed it "flavorless, emotionless music that`s easy enough to enjoy but just as easy to forget."

== Track listing ==
All tracks are written by Todd Park Mohr.

No.	Title	Length
1.	"Broken Hearted Savior"	4:21
2.	"Sister Sweetly"	4:33
3.	"Turn the Light Out"	3:37
4.	"Tomorrow Never Comes"	5:20
5.	"It's Alright"	4:00
6.	"Groove Thing"	3:00
7.	"Soul for Every Cowboy"	3:07
8.	"Ellis Island"	4:58
9.	"Bittersweet"	6:16
10.	"Circle"	6:10
11.	"Brother John"	3:13
Total length:		48:35

== Personnel ==
Big Head Todd and the Monsters

- Todd Park Mohr – vocals, guitar, keyboards
- Rob Squires – bass, backing vocals
- Brian Nevin – drums, percussion, backing vocals

Additional musicians

- David Z – additional guitar, additional percussion, producer, mixer, engineer
- Bruce McCabe – piano on track 1
- Jevetta Steele – vocals on track 5
- Leo Kottke – guitar on track 7

Technical

- Brian Poer – engineer
- George Marino – mastering
- Ray Hahnfeldt – additional engineer
- Tom Garneau – additional engineer
- Tom Tucker – additional engineer
- John Burris – pre-production engineer
- Jeff Aldrich – A&R
- Janet Levinson – art direction, design
- Melodie McDaniel – photography
