= Midnight Radio (Bohren & der Club of Gore album) =

Studio album by Bohren & der Club of Gore
- Released: 1995
- Recorded: 1993
- Genre: Jazz, dark ambient, drone
- Length: 2:25:31
- Label: Epistrophy
- Producer: Morten Gass

Bohren & der Club of Gore chronology
| Gore Motel (1993) | Midnight Radio (1995) | Sunset Mission (2000) |

Midnight Radio is the second full-length album from ambient/jazz band Bohren & der Club of Gore, released in 1995. It is also the last Bohren album to feature Reiner Henseleit, who was replaced on the band's next album, Sunset Mission, by saxophone player Christoph Clöser.

== Track listing ==
Side one
| No. | Title | Length |
|---|---|---|
| 1. | "1" | 22:34 |
| 2. | "2" | 13:12 |
| 3. | "3" | 10:23 |
| 4. | "4" | 13:00 |
| 5. | "5" | 12:38 |
| Total length: | | 1:11:47 |

Side two
| No. | Title | Length |
|---|---|---|
| 1. | "6" | 11:34 |
| 2. | "7" | 12:32 |
| 3. | "8" | 12:29 |
| 4. | "9" | 12:09 |
| 5. | "10" | 12:17 |
| 6. | "11" | 12:47 |
| Total length: | | 1:13:44 2:24:44 |

== Personnel ==
- Thorsten Benning – drums
- Morten Gass – piano, Rhodes
- Robin Rodenberg – bass
- Reiner Henseleit – guitar
