= Hazel Miller =

American blues, pop and gospel singer

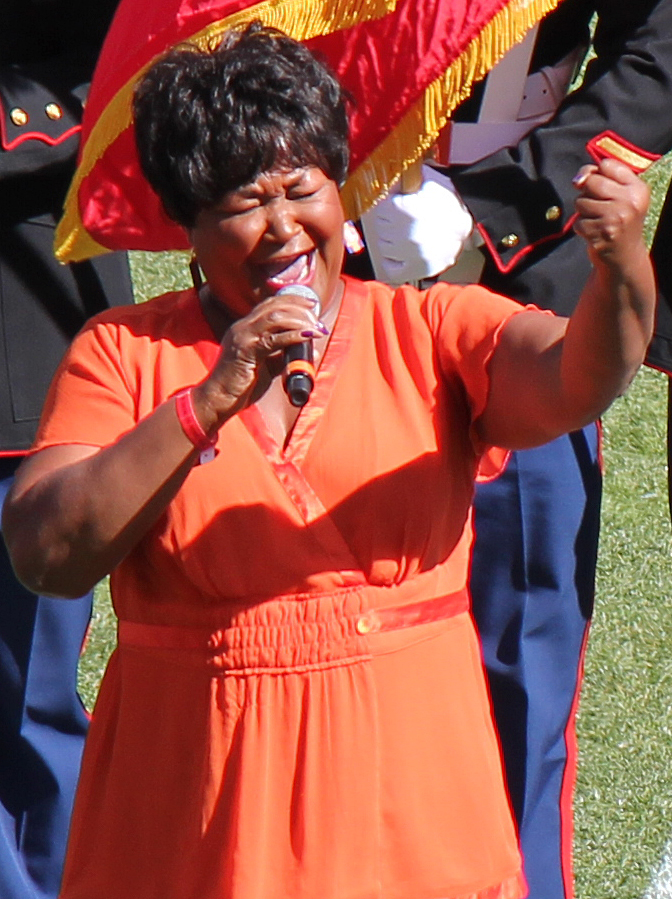
- Miller singing "The Star-Spangled Banner" at Mile High Stadium in 2014

Background information
- Born: 1954 (age 71–72); Louisville, Kentucky
- Origin: Denver, Colorado
- Genres: Blues; jazz; pop; gospel
- Occupation: Musician
- Instrument: Singer
- Years active: Since 1969
- Labels: USA 1 Stop; Hapi Skratch
- Member of: Hazel Miller & The Collective
- Formerly of: Hazel Miller and the Caucasians; The Hazel Miller Band
- Website: hazelmiller.biz

Hazel Miller (born 1954) is an American blues, jazz, pop and gospel singer. Originally from Kentucky, she has performed in the Denver, Colorado area since 1984.

== Early life ==
Miller was born in 1954 in Louisville, Kentucky, as one of seven children. She began singing professionally at the age of 15 and featured prominently in the Louisville music scene. She sang backup for Al Green, and opened for Mel Tormé and Lou Rawls. Her band was the first African-American band to play regularly at the Louisville Hyatt Hotel.

In 1982, Miller recorded the song "Look What We Can Do, Louisville", at the request of then-Mayor Harvey I. Sloane as part of a campaign to promote the community. It went on to become considered the city's theme song.

== Career ==
In 1984, while relocating to Los Angeles with her two children, Miller's rental truck broke down in Denver, and she decided to stay. Since then, she has performed in Colorado and beyond. A review in the Rocky Mountain News called her "a force of nature", and described her voice as "moving and powerful". She played at the Red Rocks Amphitheatre near Denver, at the White House for then President Bill Clinton, and for the Denver Broncos after their 1998 Super Bowl win. Miller has toured with the military five times, including playing at Iwo Jima. She has been a regular performer on the ETown Radio Show, airing on NPR's national affiliate stations. Her recorded voice greets visitors taking the trains to the main terminal at Denver International Airport.

In 2008 she launched Hazel Miller Entertainment and became a booking agent. She has sung with or opened for Julian Lennon, Peter, Paul & Mary, Charlie Musselwhite, James Taylor, James Brown, the Temptations, and many others. In addition, she toured for five years with Big Head Todd and the Monsters, and has performed at major jazz and music festivals throughout Colorado.

== Discography ==
Albums

- 1995: Hazel Miller and the Caucasians (Live at the Fox)
- 2001: I'm Still Looking (USA 1 Stop label)
- 2001: Live at the Fox (Hapi Skratch Records label)
- 2006: Icons (Hazel Miller label)

Contributions

- 1995: KBCO Studio C Vol. 5
- 2004: KBCO Studio C Local Edition
- 2014 Blues Master 3

== Awards ==
- 1995, 1996, 1997: Westword Readers Poll Best Blues/R&B band
- 2002: National Independent Music Award for Best Independent Blues-R&B Recording
- 2008: Recognized as one of the 150 people who make Denver a better place to live
- Local award for "Best Local Star in a Theatrical Production", for her appearance in a Colorado production of The Vagina Monologues
- 2023: inducted into the Colorado Music Hall of Fame
- 2024: Westword Best of Denver Best Legendary Soul Singer
