= List of works by Cary Brothers =

This is a list of works for American rock musician Cary Brothers.

== Studio albums ==
- Who You Are (2007)
- Under Control (2010)
- Bruises (2018)

== EPs and singles ==
- All the Rage (December 14, 2004)
- Waiting for Your Letter (September 20, 2005)
- Ride (March 25, 2008)
- Father Christmas (November 17, 2009)
- Covers Volume One (May, 2012)
- Let Me Be (May 14, 2013)
- Lovin' on You (February 3, 2015)
- Covers Volume Two (July 15, 2016)

== Contributions ==
- Joshua Radin – Co-producer of the EP First Between 3rd and 4th
- Joshua Radin – Producer of "Winter" from We Were Here
- Tiësto – Vocals/Co-Write on "Here On Earth" from the album Kaleidoscope
- Jim Bianco – Background Vocals on "Sing" and "If Your Mama Knew" from the album Sing
- Jim Bianco – Member of the choir on "Sinners" from the album Loudmouth
- Jessie Baylin – Background Vocals on "Leave Your Mark" from the album Firesight
- Ben Lee – Background Vocals on "What's So Bad (About Feeling Good)?" from the album The Rebirth of Venus
- Greg Laswell – Background Vocals on multiple tracks from the album Take A Bow
- Kele Okereke (of Bloc Party) / Tiësto – Harmonies on "It's Not The Things You Say" from the album Kaleidoscope
- The Scene Aesthetic – Background Vocals/Co-Write on "Lonely Girl" from the album Brother
- Swiss American Federation – Vocals/Co-Write on "Oxygen" from S.A.F.'s EP (2011)
- Cosmic Gate – Vocals/Co-Write on "Wake Your Mind" from the album Wake Your Mind (2011)
- Cosmic Gate – Vocals/Co-Write on "Start to Feel" from the album Start to Feel (2014)

== Song appearances ==
=== Film ===
- Garden State (2004) (song: "Blue Eyes")
- Sky High (2005) (song: "True")
- SherryBaby (2006) (song: "Loneliest Girl in the World")
- The Last Kiss (2006) (song: "Ride")
- Feast of Love (2007) (song: "Honestly")
- Easy A (2010) (song: "If You Were Here")
- Where We're Meant to Be (2016) (song: "Someday")
- The Secret Life Of Kyle short film from the Despicable Me 3 DVD (2017) (song: "True")
- The Croods: A New Age (2020) (song: "True")
- A Good Person (2023) (song: "Stardust") (performed in the movie)
- No Hard Feelings (2023) (song: "Back to the Start")

=== Television ===
- Grey's Anatomy
  - "Begin the Begin" (2006) (song: "Ride")
  - "Forever Young" (2007) (song: "The Last One")
  - "Superfreak" (2010) (song: "Belong")
  - "Go It Alone" (2014) (song: "Something About You")
- Scrubs
  - "My First Kill" (2004) (song: "Blue Eyes")
  - "My Last Chance" (2004) (songs: "Honestly" and "Something")
  - "My Best Laid Plans" (2005) (songs: "Honestly", "Waiting For Your Letter")
  - "Her Story II" (2006) (song: "Ride")
- ER
  - "Strange Bedfellows" (2006) (song: "Ride")
- Cold Case
  - "Witness Protection" (2009) (song: "If You Were Here")
- Psych
  - "Murder?... Anyone?... Anyone?... Bueller?" (2008) (song: "If You Were Here")
- One Tree Hill
  - "Hundred" (2008) (song: "Ride")
  - "Don't You Forget About Me" (2010) (song: "If You Were Here")
  - "I Can't See You, But I Know You're There" (2010) (songs: "Belong" and "Can't Take My Eyes Off You")
  - "Nobody Taught Us to Quit" (2010) (song: "Alien")
  - "Anyone Who Had A Heart" (2012) (song: "Free Like You Make Me")
- Kyle XY
  - "Pilot" (2006) (songs: "Supposed to be" and "Ride")
  - "Sleepless in Seattle" (2006) (song: "Honestly")
  - "Blame It on the Rain" (2006) (song: "All the Rage")
  - "The First Cut is the Deepest" (2008) (song: "The Glass Parade")
- Eli Stone
  - "Father Figure" (2008) (song: "All The Rage")
- Bones
  - "The Man in the Wall" (2005) (song: "Something")
- Smallville
  - "Aqua" (2005) (song: "Waiting For Your Letter")
  - "Harvest" (2010) (song: "Can't Take My Eyes Off You")
- Greek
  - "The Popular Vote" (2008) (song: "Wasted One")
  - "From Rushing With Love" (2008) (song: "Something")
- Pretty Little Liars
  - "Can You Hear Me Now" (2010) (song: "Ride")
  - "Save The Date" (2011) (song: "Alien")
- Make It or Break It
  - "If Only..." (2010) (song: "Alien")
- Cougar Town
  - "All Mixed Up" (2010) (song: "Belong")
- 90210
  - "Holiday Madness" (2010) (song: "Belong")
- The Lying Game
  - "Bad Boys Break Hearts" (2011) (song: "Ride")
- Life Unexpected
  - "Affair Remembered" (2011) (song: "Belong")
- The Vampire Diaries
  - "Homecoming" (2011) (song: "Free Like You Make Me")
  - "Smells Like Teen Spirit" (2011) (song: "Take Your Time")
  - "O Come, All Ye Faithful" (2012) (song: "O Holy Night")
  - "A View To A Kill" (2013) (song: "If You Were Here")
  - "Graduation" (2013) (song: "Belong")
  - "I Know What You Did Last Summer" (2013) (song: "Run Away")
  - "Because" (2015) (song: "Can't Take My Eyes Off You")
- Switched at Birth
  - "Game On." (2012) (song: "Belong")
- Private Practice
  - "Good Grief" (2012) (song: "Ordinary World")
- Beauty and the Beast
  - "Insatiable" (2013) (song: "Free Like You Make Me")

== TV appearances ==
- The Late Late Show with Craig Kilborn – September 20, 2004
- Scrubs – My First Kill (2004)
- The Late Late Show with Craig Ferguson – September 27, 2007
- Jimmy Kimmel Live! – February 29, 2008
- Talking Marriage with Ryan Bailey – December 3, 2014
