= Meiko (singer) =

American singer-songwriter

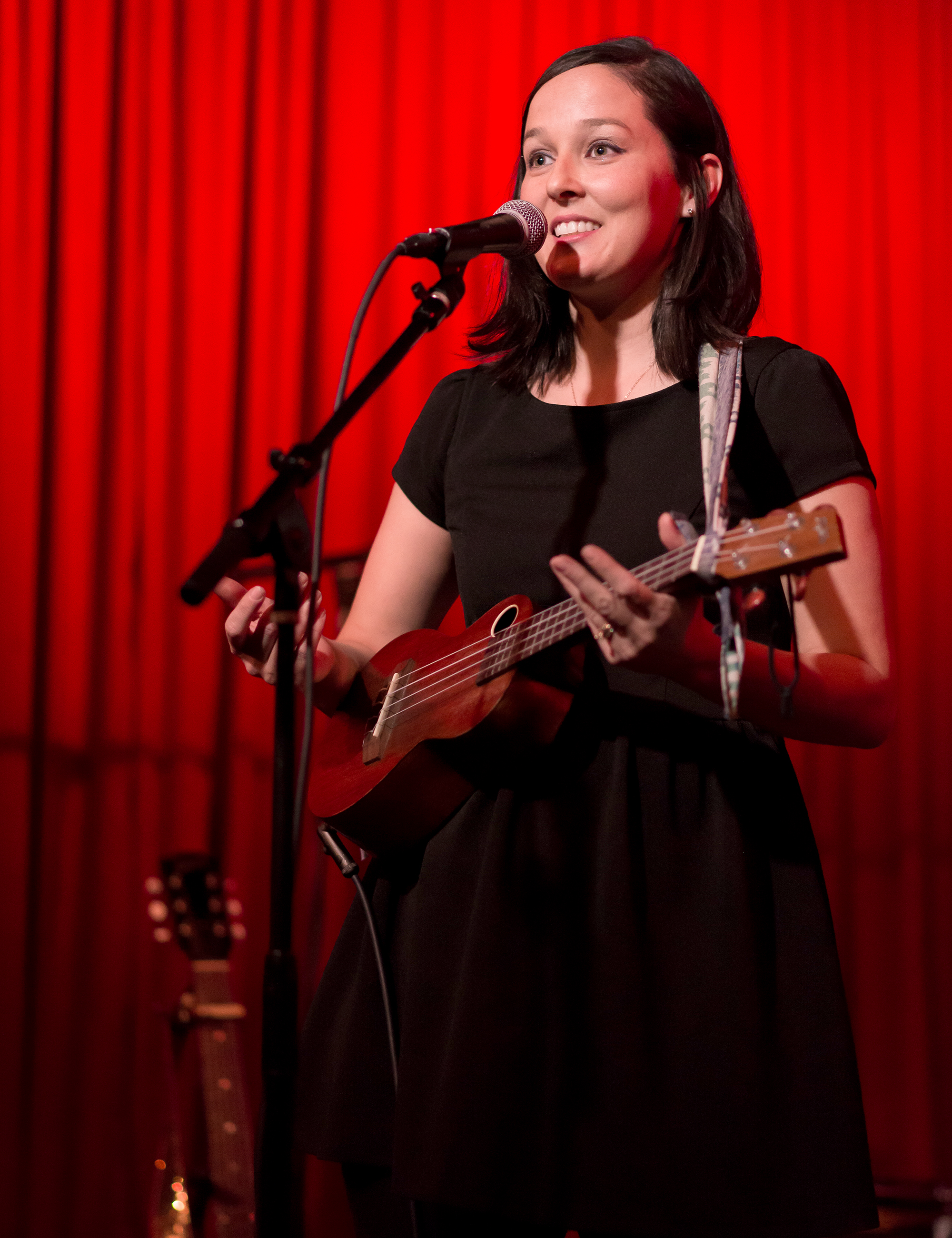
- Meiko in 2018.

Background information
- Born: Melissa McAllister Sheppard; February 25, 1982 (age 44); Roberta, Georgia, US
- Genres: Adult alternative, indie pop, folk
- Occupations: Singer-songwriter
- Instruments: Voice, guitar
- Label: Unsigned
- Website: meikomusic.com

Melissa McAllister Sheppard, known professionally as Meiko (/ˈmiːkoʊ/), is an American singer-songwriter residing in London, England. She independently released a self-titled album on September 1, 2007. All of the tracks from the LP have been featured in major network TV shows. Her second full-length, titled The Bright Side, was released through Fantasy Records on May 15, 2012, and a single from the album, "Stuck On You", reached No. 1 on the combined Japanese AirPlay Chart and No. 1 on the International Chart in Japan.

== Early life ==
Meiko was born on February 25, 1982 in Roberta, Georgia and raised by her father. Meiko first stepped in front of an audience at the age of eight, singing "White Christmas" for parishioners of a Southern Baptist church. In the years that followed, she performed everywhere from talent shows to Little League baseball parks. When she was not performing, she was practicing – spending countless hours singing into the family's clothes dryer. "Great acoustics," she insisted. She soon developed an interest in writing songs and enlisted the help of her dad, who taught her how to play guitar on his Gibson six-string. When she was thirteen, he bought her a guitar of her own. A flood of songs followed. "As soon as I learned a new chord," she says, "I wrote a new song." She has one sibling, designer Kelly Nishimoto.

== Music career ==
=== 2007–2013: Beginnings and self-titled debut studio album ===
At age eighteen, after a brief stop in Miami, she moved to Los Angeles, playing venues all over Southern California and writing at a prolific pace. She performed (and bartended) at Hollywood's Hotel Café, where she still performs regularly.

In early 2007, Meiko performed at the Sundance Film Festival and caught the ear of Paste Magazine editor Josh Jackson, who declared her a "big success story" waiting to happen, predicting it was "only a matter of time" before she found her way onto Nic Harcourt's influential "Morning Becomes Eclectic" radio program on KCRW.

In September 2007, she toured nationally with Brett Dennen and in October, she toured the U.S. as the opener for Mat Kearney.

In 2008, Meiko performed at the Sundance Film Festival and SXSW, and participated in the nationwide Hotel Café Tour, which also included Rachael Yamagata, Ingrid Michaelson, Cary Brothers, and Sara Bareilles.

In June 2008 Meiko signed a recording deal with MySpace Records/DGC, who released her album in partnership with Lucky Ear Music (Meiko's own indie label). The Lucky Ear/MySpace/DGC release has been remixed, premastered and includes re-recorded versions and a new track, "Boys with Girlfriends". The digital album re-release was August 5, 2008.

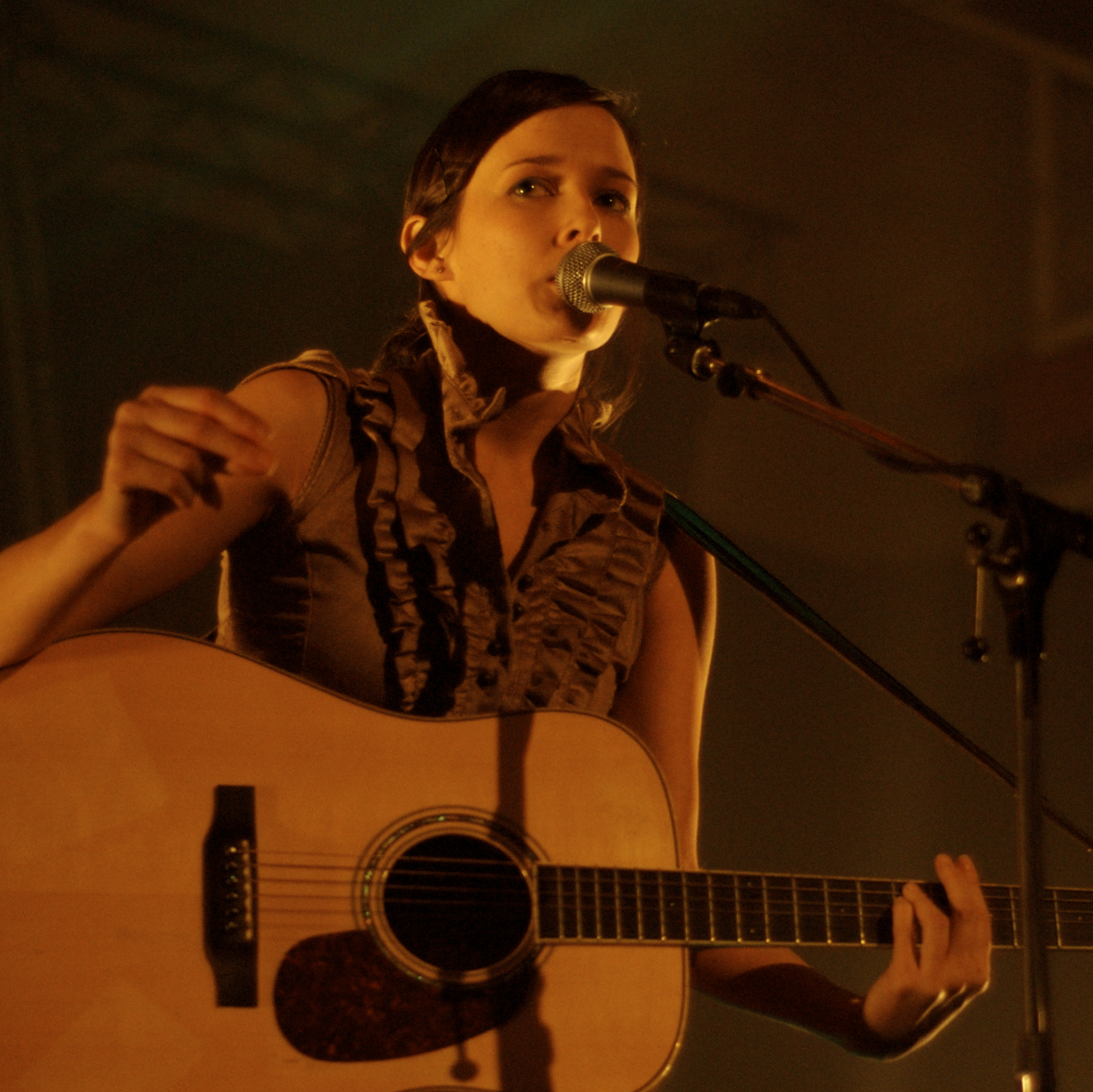
Meiko performing in 2007.

Also in August, she toured the U.S. (Three dates in Southern California) with Joe Purdy, Chris Seefried and Jay Nash. In the fall of 2008, Meiko joined another Hotel Cafe Tour – this time around the trek featured an all-female lineup. Meiko was the only artist performing all dates of the tour. From February–March 2009, Meiko performed on a string of U.S. dates in support of Joshua Radin. In May 2009, she embarked on her first-ever headlining U.S. tour. In June 2009, Meiko hit the road with Eric Hutchinson, and in July 2009, she performed a string of shows in the UK before playing in the United States territory of Guam. In October and November 2009 Meiko toured the U.S. with Jewel.

Meiko's album was digitally released in Australia on October 9, 2009, and reached No. 2 on the iTunes Australia Singer-Songwriter Albums chart. The album was physically released October 23, 2009.

After spending most of the first half of 2010 writing new material, Meiko entered a Los Angeles recording studio in September 2010 with producers Styrofoam (Jimmy Eat World, Postal Service, Of Montreal) and Jimmy Messer (Kelly Clarkson, Neon Trees) to begin recording songs for her second album.

She signed a new recording contract with Fantasy Records/Concord Records in late 2011, with her second album titled The Bright Side released on May 15, 2012.

=== 2014–2016: Breakthrough with Dear You ===
Meiko released her third full-length album, titled Dear You, on October 14, 2014, through Fantasy Records/Concord Records. Remixes of "Be Mine", the first single from the album, reached No. 25 on the Billboard Dance Club Songs chart.

Meiko decided to part ways with her label in early 2015, and independently released a live EP titled Live Songs From The Hotel Cafe on October 23, 2015. The 7-song release features six live versions of fan favorites recorded during various Meiko concerts at the venerable L.A. venue The Hotel Café, including the previously unreleased show-closer "You Gotta F**kin’ Tip." An additional brand new live track titled "Perfect Fit" is included as well.

Meiko independently released a new album titled Moving Day on June 24, 2016.

According to her website, Meiko gave birth to her first child on July 15, 2016.

=== 2018–present: Cover songs and recent developments ===
On January 26, 2018, Meiko released a cover of The Cranberries single "Zombie" through the independent label Chesky Records. The track will also be featured on Meiko's Playing Favorites album, due out on May 25, 2018, through Chesky Records.

On March 16, 2018, Meiko released another song called "Back in the Game" through the independent label WAX Ltd.

May 25, 2018 saw the release of Meiko's Playing Favorites album through independent label Chesky Records. The 12-song collection of live cover songs debuted at No. 17 on the Billboard Heat seekers Albums Chart. It was released on limited-edition pink vinyl on December 14, 2018.

On December 7, 2018, Meiko released a new holiday single called "Merry Christmas Wherever You Are".

Meiko independently released a new original single titled "Gimme Gimme" on April 26, 2019.

She released a full new album on May 21, 2019, called In Your Dreams.

She released a three-song EP on May 26, 2020, called "Weird World".

== Origins of name ==
Meiko is of Japanese heritage; her maternal grandmother from Japan died when she was eight years old. According to Meiko, her grandmother felt a strong urge to assimilate into American culture and only spoke English to her children, never Japanese, and so, Meiko and her mother never learned much of the language or the culture. After her grandmother's death, she and her sister began to refer to one another as Meiko and Keiko, both Japanese names. However, without a Japanese speaker to help them, they mispronounced them as "mee-ko" and "kee-ko," whereas they are actually pronounced "may-ko" and "kay-ko." Though Meiko later learned they'd been pronouncing the names incorrectly, they "didn't have the heart to change it."

== Instruments ==
Meiko has played a Gibson 1951 J-50 and has played many live shows with her Gibson 1942 LG2 which "doesn't have a pickup." Meiko currently plays a Gibson B-25.

== Discography ==
=== Albums ===
- Meiko (2007, self-released), No. 28 Billboard Top Heatseekers
- Meiko (2008, Lucky Ear/MySpace/DGC), (re-release) No. 159 Billboard 200; No. 14 Billboard Top Heatseekers
- The Bright Side (2012, Fantasy/Concord Records) No. 183 Billboard 200; No. 4 Billboard Top Heatseekers
- Dear You (2014, Fantasy/Concord Records)
- Lovers & Fighters – EP (2015, Fantasy/Concord Records)
- Live Songs From The Hotel Cafe – EP (2015, self-released)
- Moving Day (2016, self-released), No. 139 Billboard 200; No. 9 Billboard Top Heatseekers
- Playing Favorites (2018, Chesky Records), #17 Billboard Top Heatseekers
- In Your Dreams (2019, self-released)
- Sorry I Missed You (2022, self-released)

=== Singles ===
- "Maybe Next Year (X-Mas Song)" (2007, self-released)
- "Boys with Girlfriends" (2008, Lucky Ear/MySpace/DGC)
- "Under My Bed" (2009, Lucky Ear/MySpace/DGC)
- "All of Me" (2009, Lucky Ear/MySpace/DGC)
- "Leave The Lights On" (2012, Fantasy/Concord)
- "Stuck On You" (2012, Fantasy/Concord)
- "Bad Things" (2013, Fantasy/Concord)
- "Be Mine" (2014, Fantasy/Concord)
- "We All Fall Down" (2016, self-released)
- "Zombie" (2018, Chesky Records)
- "Back in the Game" (2018, WAX LTD)
- "Merry Christmas Wherever You Are" (2018, self-released)
- "Gimme Gimme" (2019, self-released)
- "Weird World" (2020, self-released)

=== Guest appearances ===
- AM – Side By Side – Duets Vol. 1 (2008, AM Sounds) (song: "New Road")
- Joshua Radin – Simple Times (2008, Mom + Pop Records) (song: "Sky")
- The Crystal Method – Divided by Night (2009, Tiny e Records) (song: "Falling Hard")
- Kris Allen – Thank You Camellia (2012, RCA Records) (song: "Loves Me Not")
- Morgan Page – DC To Light (2015, Nettwerk Records) (song: "Think Of You")
- Morgan Page – Born To Fly EP (2018, Armada Records) (song: "Habit")

=== Compilation appearances ===
- Penelope soundtrack (2008, Lakeshore) (song: "Piano Song")
- Hotel Cafe Presents: Winter Songs (2008, Sony), (song: "Maybe Next Year (X-Mas Song)")
- His Way, Our Way (Sinatra Tribute) (2009)
- Cities 97 Sampler: Vol. 27 (2015), (song: "Be Mine")
- Jem and the Holograms soundtrack (2015, Hasbro Studios) (song: "Abracadabra")

=== Music videos ===
- "Boys With Girlfriends"
- "How Lucky We Are"
- "Under My Bed"
- "Leave The Lights On"
- "Stuck On You"
- "Bad Things"
- "Be Mine"

=== Television performances ===
- The Bonnie Hunt Show – September 8, 2008 (debut episode of the program)
- Late Night with Conan O'Brien – September 11, 2008
- Good Day Alabama – October 10, 2008
- Good Day Atlanta – October 22, 2008
- Last Call with Carson Daly – December 11, 2008
- WGN Morning News – March 3, 2009
- WPIX Morning News – July 7, 2009
- Fox News Baltimore – October 27, 2009
- KXAN News Austin – March 16, 2012
- WGN Morning News – March 23, 2012
- The Jay Leno Show – June 12, 2012
- Fox News San Diego – June 14, 2012
- Fox6 Milwaukee – July 5, 2012
- Windy City Live – July 6, 2012
- JBTV – October 6, 2012
- Guitar Center Sessions – December 21, 2012
- KITV 4 Morning News Honolulu – June 4, 2014
- VH1 Big Morning Buzz Live – December 3, 2014

=== Television song appearances ===
- Grey's Anatomy – Season 4, Episode 1 (song: "Reasons to Love You")
- Grey's Anatomy – Season 4, Episode 4 (song: "Hawaii")
- Moonlight – Season 1, Episode 5 (song: "Sleep")
- Kyle XY – Season 2, Episode 17 (song: "Heard It All Before")
- Good Morning America Weekend Edition – December 8, 2007 (song: "Reasons to Love You")
- The Cleaner – Season 1, Episode 3 (song: "Said and Done")
- One Tree Hill – Season 6, Episode 4 (song: "Said and Done")
- The Hills – Season 4, Episode 10 (song: "Boys with Girlfriends")
- Knight Rider – Season 1, Episode 7 (song: "Reasons to Love You")
- Privileged – Season 1, Episode 10 (song: "Under My Bed")
- Grey's Anatomy – Season 5, Episode 9 (song: "Boys with Girlfriends")
- One Tree Hill – Season 6, Episode 13 (song: "Hawaii")
- 90210 – Season 1, Episode 13 (song: "Under My Bed")
- Kyle XY – Season 3, Episode 8 (song: "Reasons to Love You")
- Kyle XY – Season 3, Episode 10 (song: "Hiding")
- Ghost Whisperer – Season 4, Episode 19 (song: "Reasons to Love You")
- My Fake Fiance (song: "You Can't Hurry Love")
- So You Think You Can Dance – Season 6, Episode 1 (song: "Reasons to Love You")
- Secrets of Aspen – Season 1, Episode 3 (song: "Said And Done")
- 10 Things I Hate About You – Season 1, Episode 19 (song: "Under My Bed")
- Pretty Little Liars – Season 1, Episode 5 (song: "Heard It All Before")
- The Vampire Diaries – Season 2, Episode 3 (song: "Under My Bed")
- Giuliana and Bill – Season 5, Episode 1 (song: "Hawaii")
- Giuliana and Bill – Season 5, Episode 3 (songs: "Heard It All Before", "Said And Done")
- Giuliana and Bill – Season 5, Episode 5 (song: "Hiding")
- Giuliana and Bill – Season 5, Episode 14 (song: "How Lucky We Are")
- Giuliana and Bill – Season 5, Episode 18 (song: "Sleep")
- Awkward – Season 2, Episode 5 (song: "Stuck On You")
- The Mob Doctor – Season 1, Episode 9 (song: "Maybe Next Year (X-Mas Song)")
- Suburgatory – Season 2, Episode 11 (song: "Shoot For The Moon")
- Pretty Little Liars – Season 4, Episode 8 (song: "Bad Things")
- Wonderland – Season 1, Episode 1 (song: "Stuck On You")
- Wonderland – Season 1, Episode 6 (song: "Walk By")
- Wonderland – Season 1, Episode 7 (song: "Piano Song")
- The Vampire Diaries – Season 5, Episode 5 (song: "Bad Things")
- Big Tips Texas – Season 1, Episode 7 (song: "I'm In Love")
- Switched at Birth – Season 3, Episode 19 (song: "Bad Things")
- Red Band Society – Season 1, Episode 3 (song: "Stuck On You")
- The Vampire Diaries – Season 6, Episode 17 (song: "You're Mine (The Chase)")
- Wedding Band – Season 1, Episode 10 (song: "I'm In Love")
- Big Tips Texas – Season 1, Episode 7 (song: "I'm In Love")
- Bull – Season 1, Episode 13 (song: "Perfect Fit")

=== Feature film song appearances ===
- Pants On Fire (song: "How Lucky We Are")
- Pretty Ugly People (song: "You & Onions")
- Wake (song: "Heard It All Before")
- TiMER (song: "Piano Song")
- Silverlake Video (songs: "Piano Song", "Reasons To Love You", "Heard It All Before", "Boys With Girlfriends")
- Into The Cold (song: "Hawaii")
- Love Me (song: "Under My Bed")
