= This Is How a Heart Breaks =

2005 single by Rob Thomas

Single by Rob Thomas

from the album ...Something to Be
- Released: June 13, 2005
- Studio: The Hit Factory (New York City); BiCoastal Music (Ossining, New York); Conway, Henson (Los Angeles)
- Length: 3:50
- Label: Atlantic; Melisma
- Songwriters: Rob Thomas; Christian Karlsson; Pontus Winnberg; Henrik Jonback
- Producer: Matt Serletic

Rob Thomas singles chronology
"Lonely No More" (2005)	"This Is How a Heart Breaks" (2005)	"Ever the Same" (2005)

Music video
- "This Is How A Heart Breaks" on YouTube

"This Is How a Heart Breaks" is the second single from Matchbox Twenty frontman Rob Thomas's debut album, ...Something to Be (2005). Released in June 2005, the song was moderately successful on the charts, peaking at number 52 in the United States and number 13 in Australia. It was certified gold by the Recording Industry Association of America (RIAA) for selling over 500,000 copies, and in 2006, it was nominated for a Grammy for Best Rock Vocal Performance, Solo.

== Music video ==
The video, directed by Pedro Romhanyi, begins with images of New York City before cutting to Thomas singing as he walks along the street. He suddenly sees someone and runs away, chased through the New York streets by this individual. As the video progresses, Thomas escapes from the pursuer and sings a few lines while walking along another part of the city. Just as he finishes the second verse, the hooded pursuer catches up again and Thomas runs through a bar, escaping through the bar's basement door.

Thomas loses the pursuer again and goes into an elevator in another building. Once the elevator opens, he runs up the stairs to the fire exit and when gets to the rooftop where he encounters the pursuer chasing again. The chase continues again as Thomas tries to climb down a fire escape only to fall into a trash pile at the bottom. Thomas then runs on top of some parked cars only to run into a fence which he can't climb. Cornered, Thomas finds himself face to face with the chaser. As the video ends we get a very quick glimpse of the pursuer's face, who reveals himself as Rob Thomas, meaning Thomas was chasing himself for the whole video.

== Track listings ==
US maxi-CD single

1. "This Is How a Heart Breaks" (That Kid Chris club mix) – 9:47
2. "This Is How a Heart Breaks" (Ford club mix) – 7:31
3. "This Is How a Heart Breaks" (Pull Defibrillator mix) – 6:31
4. "This Is How a Heart Breaks" (B&B club mix) – 6:22
5. "This Is How a Heart Breaks" (Ford dub mix) – 7:31

UK CD single

1. "This Is How a Heart Breaks"
2. "Lonely No More"

UK DVD single

1. "This Is How a Heart Breaks"
2. "This Is How a Heart Breaks" (5.1 Surround Sound mix)
3. "I Am an Illusion" (courtesy of Yahoo! Music)
4. "This Is How a Heart Breaks" (video)

Australian CD single

1. "This Is How a Heart Breaks"
2. "Lonely No More" (courtesy of Yahoo! Music)
3. "I Am an Illusion" (courtesy of Yahoo! Music)

== Credits and personnel ==
Credits are adapted from the Australian CD single liner notes, the ...Something to Be album booklet, and the American Society of Composers, Authors and Publishers (ASCAP) database.

Studios

- Recorded at The Hit Factory (New York City), BiCoastal Music (Ossining, New York), Conway Studios, and Henson Studios (Los Angeles)
- Mixed at The Hit Factory (New York City)
- Mastered at Gateway Mastering (Portland, Maine, US)

Personnel

- Rob Thomas – writing, vocals
- Christian Karlsson – writing
- Pontus Winnberg – writing
- Henrik Jonback – writing
- Wendy Melvoin – guitar
- Jeff Trott – guitar
- Kevin Kadish – guitar
- Mike Elizondo – bass
- Matt Serletic – keys, production
- Gerald Heyward – drums
- Greater Anointing – background vocals
- Jimmy Douglass – recording, mixing
- Greg Collins – recording
- Mark Dobson – recording, digital editing
- John O'Brien – programming
- Bob Ludwig – mastering
- Ria Lewerke – art direction
- Norman Moore – art direction
- Chris Cuffaro – photography

== Charts ==
=== Weekly charts ===
Chart (2005–2006)	Peak position
Australia (ARIA)	13
Canada CHR/Pop Top 30 (Radio & Records)	28
Canada Hot AC Top 30 (Radio & Records)	1
Hungary (Editors' Choice Top 40)	39
New Zealand (Recorded Music NZ)	24
Scottish Singles Sales (Official Charts)	48
UK Singles (Official Charts)	67
US Billboard Hot 100	52
US Adult Contemporary (Billboard)	25
US Adult Pop Airplay (Billboard)	3
US Dance Singles Sales (Billboard)	7

=== Year-end charts ===
Chart (2005)	Position
Australia (ARIA)	96
US Adult Top 40 (Billboard)	16

== Certifications ==
Region	Certification	Certified units/sales
United States (RIAA)	Gold	500,000^{*}
^{*} Sales figures based on certification alone.

== Release history ==
Region	Date	Format(s)	Label(s)	Ref.
United States	June 13, 2005	Hot adult contemporary radio	Atlantic; Melisma	
United States	July 12, 2005	Contemporary hit radio	Atlantic; Melisma	
Australia	July 18, 2005	CD	Atlantic; Melisma	
United Kingdom	September 19, 2005	CD; DVD	Atlantic; Melisma	

== In popular culture ==
In 2013, Straight No Chaser covered the song with Thomas on their Under the Influence album.
