= Who You Are (Cary Brothers album) =

Studio album by Cary Brothers
- Released: May 29, 2007; Incl. Remix: September 30, 2008
- Recorded: The Nook in 2007
- Genre: Indie rock
- Length: 50:24
- Label: Bluhammock
- Producer: Chad Fischer, Greg Collins

Cary Brothers chronology
Waiting for Your Letter (2005)	Who You Are (2007)	Under Control (2010)

Professional ratings
Review scores
Source	Rating
AbsolutePunk.net	90% link
Allmusic	3.5/5 stars

Who You Are is the first studio album by American indie rock singer Cary Brothers, released on May 29, 2007.

== Overview ==
The first single from the album was "Who You Are". The album was produced by Chad Fischer and Greg Collins. The album contains a hidden track titled "Blue Eyes," which was originally on his debut EP, All the Rage. The album also contains three other new versions of songs previously found on his two EPs: "Honestly" from All the Rage, as well as "Ride" and "Loneliest Girl in the World" from Waiting for Your Letter.

== Track listing ==
All songs written by Cary Brothers, except "If You Were Here" by Tom Bailey, Alannah Currie, and Joe Leeway

1. "Jealousy" - 4:50
2. "Ride" - 3:39
3. "Who You Are" - 3:38
4. "The Glass Parade" - 4:49
5. "Honestly" - 4:55
6. "The Last One" - 3:40
7. "Loneliest Girl in the World" - 2:55
8. "If You Were Here" - 3:48 (a cover of a song by Thompson Twins)
9. "Think Awhile" - 2:53
10. "All The Rage" - 4:25
11. "Precious Lie" - 4:41
12. "Blue Eyes" _{(Bonus Track)} - 4:19
13. "Ride (Tiësto Extended Remix)" _{(Bonus Track)} - 7:05

== Personnel ==
- Jason Kanakis - Guitar (tracks: 1 - 11), Bass (tracks: 1,2,8,9)
- Chad Fischer - producer (tracks: 1, 2, 5 to 11), mixing (tracks: 5, 8, 11)
- Greg Collins - producer (tracks: 3, 4), mixing (tracks: 5, 8, 11), additional production (tracks: 1, 2, 6, 9, 11)
- Stephen Hague - additional production (track 6)
- Mike Lazer - mastering
- Michael Muller - Photography

== Reviews ==
- "It's the music that plays in your head before that first kiss with a new crush, and the music that radiates in your ears as you walk home after they break your heart. It's the kind of music you can tie to memories so vividly that repeated listens conjure the smells, the tastes, and the other sensory images of the best (and worst) days of your life... it will be this album that solidifies the artist as one of the most entrancing in a budding musical landscape." – Jason Tate, AbsolutePunk
- "Who You Are is an impressive debut... The acoustic core of his debut album is augmented by Chad Fischer's sensitive production, encompassing Daniel Lanois' chilled-out panoramas and the intimate warmth of Joe Boyd at his best. This combination finds convincing expression in the lilting simplicity of "Honestly" and the truly beautiful but all too brief, "Loneliest Girl In The World," where guitar picking is graced with icy trickles of piano and reverb-wreathed strings. "Ride" would lift the most cynical and leaden of hearts clear into the stratosphere." – Sid Smith, BBC Music
- "Well crafted, beautiful, and simply perfect pop album" – Music Glob
- "It's the kind of record that you want to listen to all the way through." – Entertainment Weekly
- "On Who You Are [Brothers] consciously strives for something much more than just a singer-songwriter album fleshed out with typical studio players. The Nashville-bred Brothers was raised on moody Brit-rock acts such as The Smiths and The Cure…awash in reverb, dreamy synths and shimmering guitars, Who You Are harkens back to the bands that inspired him." – No Depression, July/August 2007
- "Who You Are is beautiful in its simplicity... Using hushed guitars and strings, simple piano lines, and delicate atmospheric currents, he lets his voice power through and draw you in. It's the type of record you find yourself reaching for, no matter what your mood." – Hero Hill
- "This really is an excellent record... I recommend Who You Are not only as a snapshot of one of the better pop-songwriters making music today in his young prime, but also because when you strip away all the visual media cameos and soundtrack placements; Cary Brothers is one heck of a songwriter." – Trent Moore, Sound the Sirens
- "I dig Cary... There's a lot of singer-songwriters all trying to do the same thing that Cary has attempted but you know, ultimately it just comes down to the songs... Who You Are deserves your ears." – Bruce Warren, WXPN
- "Most accurately described as a singer/songwriter in the ilk of Damien Rice and Joshua Radin, but requiring less work to embrace than either, Cary Brothers is required listening for a developing generation of fans of smart, heartfelt, original music, and Who You Are should quickly find its way to the top of their rotation." – The Boston Globe
- "I think I'm saying enough when I say (Cary) is in the same caliber as the rest of the musicians on the Grammy Award winning soundtrack, Garden State. Cary Brothers is able to capture the type of nostalgia that can be likened to the sounds of Keane and Coldplay; melodic guitar paired with a delicate dose of piano. This singer-songwriter's music doesn't limit his listener to the love-tortured soul syndrome. He certainly balances the pain and the pleasure. – Jessica Smith, Aced Magazine
- "Who You Are is stunning. There really isn't a bad track on it and you should go pick it up, now." – Mike's Daily Song
- "It's easy to hear why he's become a favorite in L.A. acoustic circles..." "A lushly orchestrated debut." – Kevin Bronson, Los Angeles Times
- "Who You Are features 11 songs of bedroom pop bliss and even has a couple upbeat gems within it as well." – EACHNOTESECURE.COM
- "Maybe this will change your life, too." – Silent Uproar
- "If you close your eyes and actually listen while the album "Who You Are" spins in meaningful circles, it is near impossible not to relate the emotions and lyrical innuendos to your own personal experiences. If Lloyd Dobler had to hold that stereo high above his head all over again, a Cary Brothers song would be an ideal choice." – Music Snitch
- "Who You Are stands as an album of solid song-writing and enchanting melodies... a wonderful mixture of sonic textures... best played at night, on a long car ride home, when you need sound to blend with your thoughts. [It] falls into the category some call the 'soundtracks to our lives'" – Elizabeth Newton, PopMatters
- "You'll be hard-pressed to find a better album this year." – Mike Farley, Bullz-Eye
- "Cary has created a record that touches upon the many unique types of heartbreak we experience every day. Tunes like 'Jealousy' and the title-track 'Who You Are' (also the first single) are standouts - in each he explores the complexities of relationships with an incomparable sincerity." – Fine, Fine Music
- "Who You Are, an amalgamation of emotive pop, entrancing melodies and captivating songwriting, reintroduces Cary Brothers as a full-fledged singer/songwriter... Brothers may be the finest for penning heart-wrenching ballads that visually capture raw emotion. One of the best examples is the brief "Loneliest Girl in the World," a flawless masterpiece about the pain and heartache of desperately wanting to be loved." – PerformerMag.com
- "An astounding album." – AntiMusic.com
- "Pop hooks that are just incredibly angst-ridden and yet incredibly catchy ensnare you and reel you in for the long haul." – Smother (Editor's Pick)
- "The brilliance comes with the fact that each one of those personal experiences is something that everyone can relate to. His lyrics are similar to horoscopes. There is something in there for everyone." – My Crazy Music Blog
- "Sounds mighty damn good to us. Who You Are is a collection of slick, polished, acoustic guitar driven pop music featuring excellent vocals and arrangements that sometimes border on orchestral." – Baby Sue
- "Brothers' spartan but emotionally resonant music is a counterpoint to the slicker, prefab LA sound-makers usually rounded up in today's A&R cattle drives. Bittersweet and unplugged, his music surveys love, anger, ecstasy, depression, fear, loneliness, regret, and contentment. Sometimes all in the same song!... The perfect soundtracks for life's many, diverse moments." – MySpace Music Review
- "This is a GREAT album for all of us lovers of big music in the same vein as a huge Coldplay atmospheric sound, mixed with a 2007 version of Stone Roses... The result is nothing less than MAGIC. This album will fit like a glove on my top 10 list of best albums of 2007." – Melodic.net
- "Traces of Nick Drake burst through as the album's placid poignancy intensifies with each running track. About halfway through, you'll be reaching for the Kleenex." – Stephanie Benson, Rhapsody
