= ...Something to Be (song) =

2006 single by Rob Thomas

Single by Rob Thomas

from the album ...Something to Be
- B-side: "I Am an Illusion"
- Released: March 13, 2006
- Studio: The Hit Factory (New York City); BiCoastal Music (Ossining, New York); Conway, Henson (Los Angeles)
- Length: 4:30
- Label: Atlantic, Melisma
- Songwriter: Rob Thomas
- Producer: Matt Serletic

Rob Thomas singles chronology
"Ever the Same" (2005)	"...Something to Be" (2006)	"Streetcorner Symphony" (2006)

"...Something to Be" is the title track and fourth single from Matchbox Twenty frontman Rob Thomas's solo debut album, ...Something to Be (2005). The song features guitar work from fellow Matchbox Twenty member Kyle Cook and Tom Petty and the Heartbreakers guitarist Mike Campbell. Released on March 13, 2006, the song peaked at No. 40 in Australia.

== Track listing ==
Australian CD single

1. "...Something to Be"
2. "...Something to Be" (AOL Sessions)
3. "I Am an Illusion" (XM Sessions)

== Credits and personnel ==
Credits are adapted from the Australian CD single liner notes and the ...Something to Be booklet.

Studios

- Recorded at The Hit Factory (New York City), BiCoastal Music (Ossining, New York), Conway Studios, and Henson Studios (Los Angeles)
- Mixed at The Hit Factory (New York City)
- Mastered at Gateway Mastering (Portland, Maine, US)

Personnel

- Rob Thomas – writing, vocals
- Wendy Melvoin – guitar
- Mike Campbell – guitar
- Kyle Cook – guitar
- Mike Elizondo – bass
- Matt Serletic – keys, production
- Gerald Heyward – drums
- Cassidy – background vocals
- Matt Beck – background vocals
- Gary Grant – trumpet
- Jerry Hey – trumpet, horn arrangement
- Brandon Fields – saxophone
- Reginald Young – trombone
- Jimmy Douglass – recording, mixing
- Greg Collins – recording
- Mark Dobson – recording, digital editing
- John O'Brien – programming
- Bob Ludwig – mastering
- Ria Lewerke – art direction
- Norman Moore – art direction
- Jeremy Cowort – photography

== Charts ==
Chart (2006)	Peak position
Australia (ARIA)	40
