= 2013 O'Reilly Auto Parts Challenge =

31st race of the 2013 NASCAR Nationwide Series

Race details
- Race 31 of 33 of the 2013 NASCAR Nationwide Series
- Date: November 2, 2013
- Official name: 9th Annual O'Reilly Auto Parts Challenge
- Location: Fort Worth, Texas, Texas Motor Speedway
- Course: Permanent racing facility
- Course length: 2.41 km (1.5 miles)
- Distance: 200 laps, 300 mi (482.803 km)
- Scheduled distance: 200 laps, 300 mi (482.803 km)
- Average speed: 144.52 miles per hour (232.58 km/h)

Pole position
Driver	Alex Bowman	RAB Racing
- Time: 29.002

Most laps led
Driver	Brad Keselowski	Penske Racing
- Laps: 106

Winner
No. 22	Brad Keselowski	Penske Racing

Television in the United States
- Network: ESPN2
- Announcers: Allen Bestwick, Dale Jarrett, Andy Petree

Radio in the United States
- Radio: Performance Racing Network

The 2013 O'Reilly Auto Parts Challenge was the 31st stock car race of the 2013 NASCAR Nationwide Series and the ninth iteration of the event. The race was held on Saturday, November 2, 2013, in Fort Worth, Texas at Texas Motor Speedway, a 1.5 miles (2.4 km) permanent tri-oval shaped racetrack. The race took the scheduled 200 laps to complete. At race's end, Brad Keselowski, driving for Penske Racing, would pull away in the late stages of the race to win his 26th career NASCAR Nationwide Series win and his sixth win of the season. To fill out the podium, Denny Hamlin of Joe Gibbs Racing and Sam Hornish Jr. of Penske Racing would finish second and third, respectively.

== Background ==
The layout of Texas Motor Speedway, the venue where the race was held.

Texas Motor Speedway is a speedway located in the northernmost portion of the U.S. city of Fort Worth, Texas – the portion located in Denton County, Texas. The track measures 1.5 miles (2.4 km) around and is banked 24 degrees in the turns, and is of the oval design, where the front straightaway juts outward slightly. The track layout is similar to Atlanta Motor Speedway and Charlotte Motor Speedway (formerly Lowe's Motor Speedway). The track is owned by Speedway Motorsports, Inc., the same company that owns Atlanta and Charlotte Motor Speedway, as well as the short-track Bristol Motor Speedway.

=== Entry list ===
- (R) denotes rookie driver.
- (i) denotes driver who is ineligible for series driver points.

#	Driver	Team	Make	Sponsor
00	Blake Koch	SR² Motorsports	Toyota	Frontline Wraps
01	Mike Wallace	JD Motorsports	Chevrolet	G&K Services
2	Brian Scott	Richard Childress Racing	Chevrolet	Shore Lodge
3	Austin Dillon	Richard Childress Racing	Chevrolet	AdvoCare
4	Landon Cassill	JD Motorsports	Chevrolet	Flex Seal
5	Brad Sweet	JR Motorsports	Chevrolet	Great Clips
6	Trevor Bayne	Roush Fenway Racing	Ford	Ford EcoBoost
7	Regan Smith	JR Motorsports	Chevrolet	Lionel Racing Golden Ticket
10	Michael McDowell (i)	TriStar Motorsports	Toyota	TriStar Motorsports
11	Elliott Sadler	Joe Gibbs Racing	Toyota	OneMain Financial
12	Sam Hornish Jr.	Penske Racing	Ford	Würth
14	Jeff Green	TriStar Motorsports	Toyota	Hefty Ultimate with Arm & Hammer
16	Ricky Stenhouse Jr. (i)	Roush Fenway Racing	Ford	Zest
18	Matt Kenseth (i)	Joe Gibbs Racing	Toyota	GameStop, Battlefield 4
19	Mike Bliss	TriStar Motorsports	Toyota	Tweaker Energy Shot
20	Brian Vickers	Joe Gibbs Racing	Toyota	Dollar General
22	Brad Keselowski (i)	Penske Racing	Ford	Discount Tire
23	Robert Richardson Jr.	R3 Motorsports	Chevrolet	Willbros Group
24	Ryan Ellis	SR² Motorsports	Toyota	Frontline Wraps
30	Nelson Piquet Jr. (R)	Turner Scott Motorsports	Chevrolet	Qualcomm
31	Justin Allgaier	Turner Scott Motorsports	Chevrolet	Brandt Professional Agriculture
32	Kyle Larson (R)	Turner Scott Motorsports	Chevrolet	NTT Data
33	Ty Dillon (i)	Richard Childress Racing	Chevrolet	WESCO International
40	T. J. Bell	The Motorsports Group	Chevrolet	Redneck Heaven
42	Josh Wise	The Motorsports Group	Chevrolet	The Motorsports Group
43	Michael Annett	Richard Petty Motorsports	Ford	Pilot Travel Centers, Pringles
44	Cole Whitt	TriStar Motorsports	Toyota	Takagi Tankless Water Heaters
51	Jeremy Clements	Jeremy Clements Racing	Chevrolet	BM Exploration, RepairableVehicles.com
52	Joey Gase	Jimmy Means Racing	Toyota	Jimmy Means Racing
54	Kyle Busch (i)	Joe Gibbs Racing	Toyota	Monster Energy
55	David Starr (i)	Viva Motorsports	Chevrolet	Chasco, Striping Technology
60	Travis Pastrana	Roush Fenway Racing	Ford	Run KMC
70	Johanna Long	ML Motorsports	Chevrolet	Foretravel Motorcoach
74	Carl Long	Mike Harmon Racing	Dodge	Mike Harmon Racing
77	Parker Kligerman	Kyle Busch Motorsports	Toyota	Toyota Dream Build
79	Bryan Silas (R) (i)	Go Green Racing	Ford	Go Green Racing
87	Joe Nemechek	NEMCO Motorsports	Toyota	Wood Pellet Grills
89	Morgan Shepherd	Shepherd Racing Ventures	Chevrolet	Racing with Jesus "Advertise Here"
92	Dexter Stacey (R)	KH Motorsports	Ford	Maddie's Place Rocks
98	Kevin Swindell (R)	Biagi-DenBeste Racing	Ford	Carroll Shelby Engine Co., DenBeste Heavy Equipment
99	Alex Bowman (R)	RAB Racing	Toyota	Microsoft Windows
Official entry list

== Practice ==
=== First practice ===
The first practice session was held on Friday, November 1, at 1:05 PM CST, and would last for 55 minutes. Alex Bowman of RAB Racing would set the fastest time in the session, with a lap of 29.641 and an average speed of 182.180 miles per hour (293.190 km/h).

Pos.	#	Driver	Team	Make	Time	Speed
1	99	Alex Bowman (R)	RAB Racing	Toyota	29.641	182.180
2	33	Ty Dillon (i)	Richard Childress Racing	Chevrolet	29.657	182.082
3	77	Parker Kligerman	Kyle Busch Motorsports	Toyota	29.659	182.070
Full first practice results

=== Second practice ===
The second and final practice session, sometimes referred to as Happy Hour, was held on Friday, November 1, at 5:00 PM CST, and would last for one hour and 30 minutes. Trevor Bayne of Roush Fenway Racing would set the fastest time in the session, with a lap of 29.510 and an average speed of 182.989 miles per hour (294.492 km/h).

Pos.	#	Driver	Team	Make	Time	Speed
1	6	Trevor Bayne	Roush Fenway Racing	Ford	29.510	182.989
2	33	Ty Dillon (i)	Richard Childress Racing	Chevrolet	29.544	182.778
3	22	Brad Keselowski (i)	Penske Racing	Ford	29.577	182.574
Full Happy Hour practice results

== Qualifying ==
Qualifying was held on Saturday, November 2, at 11:05 AM CST. Each driver would have two laps to set a fastest time; the fastest of the two would count as their official qualifying lap.

Alex Bowman of RAB Racing would win the pole, setting a time of 29.002 and an average speed of 186.194 miles per hour (299.650 km/h).

Morgan Shepherd was the only driver to fail to qualify.

=== Full qualifying results ===
Pos.	#	Driver	Team	Make	Time	Speed
1	99	Alex Bowman (R)	RAB Racing	Toyota	29.002	186.194
2	22	Brad Keselowski (i)	Penske Racing	Ford	29.035	185.982
3	12	Sam Hornish Jr.	Penske Racing	Ford	29.082	185.682
4	6	Trevor Bayne	Roush Fenway Racing	Ford	29.202	184.919
5	3	Austin Dillon	Richard Childress Racing	Chevrolet	29.239	184.685
6	54	Kyle Busch (i)	Joe Gibbs Racing	Toyota	29.249	184.622
7	16	Ricky Stenhouse Jr. (i)	Roush Fenway Racing	Ford	29.290	184.363
8	7	Regan Smith	JR Motorsports	Chevrolet	29.322	184.162
9	2	Brian Scott	Richard Childress Racing	Chevrolet	29.338	184.062
10	33	Ty Dillon (i)	Richard Childress Racing	Chevrolet	29.382	183.786
11	5	Brad Sweet	JR Motorsports	Chevrolet	29.444	183.399
12	44	Cole Whitt	TriStar Motorsports	Toyota	29.479	183.181
13	18	Matt Kenseth (i)	Joe Gibbs Racing	Toyota	29.479	183.181
14	77	Parker Kligerman	Kyle Busch Motorsports	Toyota	29.511	182.983
15	31	Justin Allgaier	Turner Scott Motorsports	Chevrolet	29.514	182.964
16	32	Kyle Larson (R)	Turner Scott Motorsports	Chevrolet	29.523	182.908
17	30	Nelson Piquet Jr. (R)	Turner Scott Motorsports	Chevrolet	29.562	182.667
18	20	Denny Hamlin (i)	Joe Gibbs Racing	Toyota	29.588	182.506
19	11	Elliott Sadler	Joe Gibbs Racing	Toyota	29.605	182.402
20	19	Mike Bliss	TriStar Motorsports	Toyota	29.649	182.131
21	43	Michael Annett	Richard Petty Motorsports	Ford	29.665	182.033
22	70	Johanna Long	ML Motorsports	Chevrolet	29.747	181.531
23	98	Kevin Swindell (R)	Biagi-DenBeste Racing	Ford	29.839	180.971
24	10	Michael McDowell (i)	TriStar Motorsports	Toyota	29.968	180.192
25	55	David Starr (i)	Viva Motorsports	Chevrolet	30.006	179.964
26	51	Jeremy Clements	Jeremy Clements Racing	Chevrolet	30.065	179.611
27	4	Landon Cassill	JD Motorsports	Chevrolet	30.098	179.414
28	87	Joe Nemechek	NEMCO Motorsports	Toyota	30.126	179.247
29	24	Ryan Ellis	SR² Motorsports	Toyota	30.192	178.855
30	01	Mike Wallace	JD Motorsports	Chevrolet	30.217	178.707
31	74	Carl Long	Mike Harmon Racing	Dodge	30.278	178.347
32	42	Josh Wise	The Motorsports Group	Chevrolet	30.278	178.347
33	00	Blake Koch	SR² Motorsports	Toyota	30.366	177.830
34	14	Jeff Green	TriStar Motorsports	Toyota	30.402	177.620
35	79	Bryan Silas (R) (i)	Go Green Racing	Ford	30.445	177.369
36	40	T. J. Bell	The Motorsports Group	Chevrolet	30.574	176.621
37	52	Joey Gase	Jimmy Means Racing	Toyota	30.871	174.921
Qualified by owner's points
38	23	Robert Richardson Jr.	R3 Motorsports	Chevrolet	31.548	171.168
39	60	Travis Pastrana	Roush Fenway Racing	Ford	34.373	157.100
Last car to qualify on time
40	92	Dexter Stacey (R)	KH Motorsports	Ford	31.043	173.952
Failed to qualify
41	89	Morgan Shepherd	Shepherd Racing Ventures	Chevrolet	31.339	172.309
Official starting lineup

== Race results ==
Fin	St	#	Driver	Team	Make	Laps	Led	Status	Pts	Winnings
1	2	22	Brad Keselowski (i)	Penske Racing	Ford	200	106	running	0	$69,615
2	18	20	Denny Hamlin (i)	Joe Gibbs Racing	Toyota	200	45	running	0	$54,350
3	3	12	Sam Hornish Jr.	Penske Racing	Ford	200	2	running	42	$44,450
4	13	18	Matt Kenseth (i)	Joe Gibbs Racing	Toyota	200	42	running	0	$31,550
5	5	3	Austin Dillon	Richard Childress Racing	Chevrolet	200	2	running	40	$37,525
6	8	7	Regan Smith	JR Motorsports	Chevrolet	200	0	running	38	$27,925
7	19	11	Elliott Sadler	Joe Gibbs Racing	Toyota	200	0	running	37	$26,210
8	9	2	Brian Scott	Richard Childress Racing	Chevrolet	200	0	running	36	$25,150
9	16	32	Kyle Larson (R)	Turner Scott Motorsports	Chevrolet	200	0	running	35	$25,025
10	11	5	Brad Sweet	JR Motorsports	Chevrolet	200	0	running	34	$24,075
11	4	6	Trevor Bayne	Roush Fenway Racing	Ford	200	0	running	33	$22,300
12	10	33	Ty Dillon (i)	Richard Childress Racing	Chevrolet	200	0	running	0	$21,750
13	14	77	Parker Kligerman	Kyle Busch Motorsports	Toyota	200	0	running	31	$21,225
14	21	43	Michael Annett	Richard Petty Motorsports	Ford	200	0	running	30	$20,800
15	17	30	Nelson Piquet Jr. (R)	Turner Scott Motorsports	Chevrolet	200	0	running	29	$21,550
16	23	98	Kevin Swindell (R)	Biagi-DenBeste Racing	Ford	200	0	running	28	$20,450
17	7	16	Ricky Stenhouse Jr. (i)	Roush Fenway Racing	Ford	199	0	running	0	$15,525
18	1	99	Alex Bowman (R)	RAB Racing	Toyota	199	3	running	27	$23,600
19	15	31	Justin Allgaier	Turner Scott Motorsports	Chevrolet	199	0	running	25	$20,075
20	12	44	Cole Whitt	TriStar Motorsports	Toyota	198	0	running	24	$20,625
21	25	55	David Starr (i)	Viva Motorsports	Chevrolet	198	0	running	0	$19,825
22	26	51	Jeremy Clements	Jeremy Clements Racing	Chevrolet	198	0	running	22	$19,700
23	20	19	Mike Bliss	TriStar Motorsports	Toyota	198	0	running	21	$19,550
24	27	4	Landon Cassill	JD Motorsports	Chevrolet	197	0	running	20	$19,425
25	30	01	Mike Wallace	JD Motorsports	Chevrolet	197	0	running	19	$19,750
26	6	54	Kyle Busch (i)	Joe Gibbs Racing	Toyota	196	0	running	0	$13,150
27	34	14	Jeff Green	TriStar Motorsports	Toyota	196	0	running	17	$19,025
28	38	23	Robert Richardson Jr.	R3 Motorsports	Chevrolet	195	0	running	16	$18,900
29	35	79	Bryan Silas (R) (i)	Go Green Racing	Ford	194	0	running	0	$18,825
30	37	52	Joey Gase	Jimmy Means Racing	Toyota	190	0	running	14	$13,075
31	39	60	Travis Pastrana	Roush Fenway Racing	Ford	175	0	crash	13	$18,725
32	36	40	T. J. Bell	The Motorsports Group	Chevrolet	170	0	running	12	$18,680
33	28	87	Joe Nemechek	NEMCO Motorsports	Toyota	166	0	crash	11	$18,635
34	31	74	Carl Long	Mike Harmon Racing	Dodge	105	0	electrical	10	$18,590
35	29	24	Ryan Ellis	SR² Motorsports	Toyota	87	0	vibration	9	$18,522
36	33	00	Blake Koch	SR² Motorsports	Toyota	79	0	handling	8	$11,650
37	22	70	Johanna Long	ML Motorsports	Chevrolet	49	0	clutch	7	$17,615
38	32	42	Josh Wise	The Motorsports Group	Chevrolet	6	0	electrical	6	$11,561
39	40	92	Dexter Stacey (R)	KH Motorsports	Ford	5	0	suspension	0	$11,445
40	24	10	Michael McDowell (i)	TriStar Motorsports	Toyota	4	0	vibration	0	$11,405
Failed to qualify
41		89	Morgan Shepherd	Shepherd Racing Ventures	Chevrolet					
Official race results

== Standings after the race ==
Drivers' Championship standings

Pos	Driver	Points
1	Austin Dillon	1,107
2	Sam Hornish Jr.	1,101 (-6)
3	Regan Smith	1,053 (-54)
4	Elliott Sadler	1,026 (–81)
5	Justin Allgaier	1,022 (–85)
6	Brian Scott	1,010 (–97)
7	Trevor Bayne	1,009 (–98)
8	Brian Vickers	970 (–137)
9	Kyle Larson	945 (–162)
10	Parker Kligerman	927 (–183)
Official driver's standings

- Note: Only the first 10 positions are included for the driver standings.

Previous race: 2013 Dollar General 300 (Charlotte)	NASCAR Nationwide Series; 2013 season	Next race: 2013 ServiceMaster 200
