= Meiko (album) =

Studio album by Meiko
- Released: 2007 (self-released); August 5, 2008
- Genre: Indie pop, folk
- Length: 40:35
- Label: Lucky Ear; MySpace Records/DGC Records
- Producer: Al Sgro, Greg Collins

Meiko chronology
Meiko (2007)	The Bright Side (2012)

Professional ratings
Review scores
Source	Rating
Allmusic	4/5 stars
Slant Magazine	3.5/5 stars

Meiko is the self-titled debut studio album by Meiko, released in 2008. An earlier version of this album was self-released in 2007. The newer release features re-recorded versions of "Under My Bed" and "Said and Done", and adds Meiko's first single, "Boys with Girlfriends". The 2007 self-release features a 'secret' track at the very end of the CD, which is a song called "You and Onions".

== Track listing ==
All songs written and composed by Meiko.

1. "Reasons to Love You" – 3:17
2. "How Lucky We Are" – 2:57
3. "Heard It All Before" – 3:55
4. "Boys with Girlfriends" – 4:07
5. "Piano Song" – 2:48
6. "Hiding" — 3:17
7. "Sleep" – 4:46
8. "Said and Done" – 3:27
9. "Walk By" – 3:46
10. "Under My Bed" – 3:48
11. "Hawaii" – 4:33

== Charts ==
=== Album ===
Chart (2007/8)	Peak position
US Heatseekers Albums (Billboard)	5
US Independent Albums (Billboard)	17

=== Singles ===
Chart (2007/8)	Peak position	Song
US Adult Alternative Airplay (Billboard)	18	"Boys with Girlfriends"
