= Cary Brothers =

American singer-songwriter (born 1974)

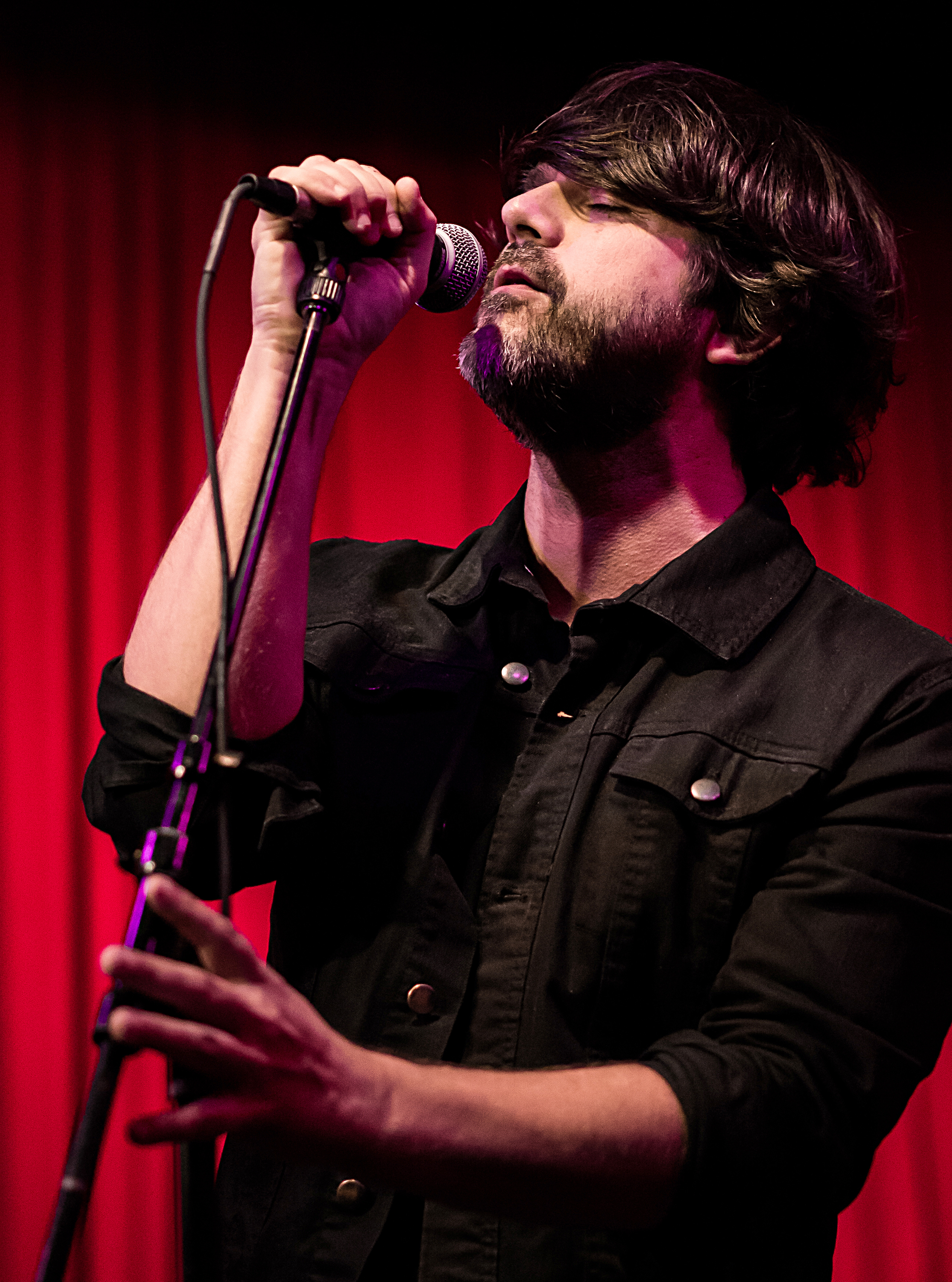
- Cary Brothers, live at the Hotel Cafe in Hollywood, Los Angeles, California, on October 8th, 2016

Background information
- Born: April 2, 1974 (age 52)
- Origin: Los Angeles, California, U.S.
- Genres: Indie rock; alternative rock
- Years active: 2003–present
- Labels: Procrastination Music (2004–07, 2009–present); Bluhammock Music (2007–09)
- Website: carybrothers.com

Robert Cary Brothers (born April 2, 1974) is an American indie rock singer-songwriter originally from Nashville, Tennessee. After moving to Los Angeles and becoming a regular performer at the influential Hotel Café venue, Brothers first gained national attention with his song "Blue Eyes" on the platinum-selling, Grammy-winning soundtrack for the movie Garden State (2006).

In the electronic dance music world, Brothers has collaborated with Tiësto on a club remix of his 2008 song "Ride" and an original song for Tiësto's 2009 album Kaleidoscope, as well as co-writing and singing the title tracks for the Cosmic Gate releases Wake Your Mind (2011) and Start to Feel (2014).

As an independent artist, Brothers has released three full-length records: Who You Are (2007), Under Control (2010) and Bruises (2018). He has toured worldwide and licensed his music extensively for film and television.

== History ==
With songs influenced by everything from 1980s British new wave music to 1970s folk music, Brothers achieved early critical and commercial success with his independent EPs All the Rage (2004) and Waiting for Your Letter (2005), both of which reached the top of the iTunes Singer-Songwriter charts.

While many artists focus their efforts on radio exposure, Brothers went a slightly different route and pushed to get songs out to the public through film and television shows as part of a generation of similar-minded indie artists in the United States. Brothers' songs have appeared on the medical dramas Grey's Anatomy, Private Practice, ER and Scrubs, the ABC sitcom Cougar Town, the Fox mystery Bones, The CW shows Smallville, One Tree Hill and The Vampire Diaries, USA Network comedy Psych, ABC Family's show Kyle XY, and the movies Easy A (2010) and Where We're Meant to Be (2016). The original version of Brothers' song "Ride" appeared on the soundtrack to the feature film The Last Kiss (2006) alongside Coldplay and Ray Lamontagne. Brothers has also performed on The Late Late Show, Jimmy Kimmel Live! and Direct TV's CD USA. In 2005, he made a guest appearance with the London artist Aqualung on the Late Show with David Letterman and The Tonight Show with Jay Leno.

Brothers plays regularly as part of the musical community at the Hotel Café in Los Angeles, and he has since toured across America and Canada with such acts as Greg Laswell, Sara Bareilles, Liz Phair, KT Tunstall, Aqualung, Ben Lee, Matt Nathanson, Imogen Heap, and The Fray. In addition to his career as a musician, he co-created The Hotel Cafe Tour, which ran for 4 years in both the U.S. and Europe. Brothers also co-produced Joshua Radin's first EP and the song "Winter" from Radin's record We Were Here.

In 2007, Cary Brothers signed a record deal with indie label Bluhammock Music for the release of his first full-length album, Who You Are, on May 29, 2007, which made the Billboard Heatseekers Chart. Produced by Chad Fischer (Alexi Murdoch) and mixed by Greg Collins (Grammy Winner – U2), the record features guest musicians Matt Hales from Aqualung and Priscilla Ahn. The video for the single "Ride" starring Brittany Snow was added to the rotation on VH1 in the U.S. In addition, the record won "Best Rock Album of 2007" by the Indie Acoustic Project. Brothers' track 'Ride' has also been mixed by Tiësto and was a success on the dancefloors of Europe in 2008. He helped close Friday night at Bonnaroo in the summer of 2008 by making a guest appearance with Tiësto and repeated this musical pairing a few months later at the O2 arena in London.

In 2009, Brothers went into the studio to work on his second full-length record. In addition, that year he had an original track called "Here on Earth" on the Tiësto record Kaleidescope alongside Sigur Rós, Tegan and Sara, Kele Okereke, Priscilla Ahn and Emily Haines.

Under Control was released on April 6, 2010, through Brothers' own Procrastination Music label and premiered at No. 1 on the iTunes Singer-Songwriter charts and No. 10 on the Billboard Heatseekers Chart. Cary toured extensively in the United States in support of the record in 2010 and 2011 as both headliner and as an opening act for the Sara Bareilles tour. Staying active in social media, Brothers was named No. 14 on Paste Magazine's "50 Musicians Worth Following on Twitter" in August 2011.

In May 2012, Brothers released a DIY collection of five cover songs entitled Covers Volume One, featuring songs by Yeah Yeah Yeahs, David Bowie, Duran Duran, INXS, and Matt & Kim. The EP also features guest vocals by Rachael Yamagata, Butterfly Boucher, and Priscilla Ahn. It premiered in the Top Ten on the iTunes Singer-Songwriter Chart. In addition, Brothers released the EPs "Let Me Be" in 2014 and "Lovin' On You" in 2015.

After touring the US and Europe in 2015 and 2017, Brothers third full-length record Bruises was released on April 27, 2018. The single “Crush" went Top 5 on KCRW's influential Morning Becomes Eclectic radio show.

In spring 2023, Brothers appeared in the film A Good Person, performing his single "Stardust" for the main character Allison (Florence Pugh). That summer, his song "Back to the Start" was featured in the Jennifer Lawrence comedy No Hard Feelings.

== Personal life ==
Brothers attended Northwestern University.

== Creative works ==
=== Studio albums ===
- Who You Are (2007)
- Under Control (2010)
- Bruises (2018)
