= Kelly Padrick =

American singer, songwriter, and actress

- Born: Providence, Rhode Island, Rhode Island, United States
- Genres: Indie, pop
- Occupations: Singer, songwriter, musician, actress
- Website: http://www.kellypadrick.com

Kelly Padrick is an American singer, songwriter, and actress. She is originally from Rhode Island and is now based in New York City.

Padrick's first song was written at the age of five. She eventually moved to New York City in order to further her career after performing in coffee shops around Rhode Island and New England.

Several of Padrick's songs have appeared in shows such as Desperate Housewives, MTV's Big Tips Texas, HBO's VICE and in Fox Searchlight's movie Trust the Man.

All eleven of Padrick's videos were directed by filmmaker Patricia Chica.

== Discography ==
- Haze (2005)
- Carmine Street (2007)
- Hello My Love (2010)
- Soulmate (2011)
- Dear Love (2014)
- The Brooklyn Hours (EP, 2009)
- The Kind of Girl (EP, 2013)
- Radiance (EP, 2014)
- It's Only Me (2016)
- On the Line (2016)
- Fires (EP, 2018)
- The Real Me (EP, 2021)
- Butterflies (EP, 2026)
