= ...Something to Be =

2005 studio album by Rob Thomas

Studio album by Rob Thomas
- Released: April 19, 2005
- Recorded: 2004–2005
- Genres: Pop rock; alternative rock
- Length: 50:05
- Labels: Atlantic; WEA
- Producer: Matt Serletic

Rob Thomas chronology
...Something to Be (2005)	Cradlesong (2009)

Singles from ...Something to Be
- 1. "Lonely No More" Released: February 14, 2005; 2. "This Is How a Heart Breaks" Released: June 13, 2005; 3. "Ever the Same" Released: November 7, 2005; 4. "...Something to Be" Released: March 13, 2006; 5. "Streetcorner Symphony" Released: October 16, 2006

...Something to Be is the debut solo album from the Matchbox Twenty lead singer Rob Thomas. The album was released on April 19, 2005, and it debuted at No. 1 on the US Billboard 200 albums chart, knocking out Mariah Carey's The Emancipation of Mimi.

The album spawned the US top ten hit "Lonely No More". It also features John Mayer's guitar on the single "Streetcorner Symphony". The album was released in the DualDisc format, the first major album to be released that way. The album itself is certified Double Platinum by the RIAA in the US and consists of several types of sounds, including dance, pop, Latin, rock, and country, although it can be generally classified as closer to pop than to the rock music of Matchbox Twenty's third studio album, More Than You Think You Are. The album was supported by his 2005–2006 Something to Be Tour.

== Critical reception ==
Professional ratings
Aggregate scores
Source	Rating
Metacritic	57/100
Review scores
Source	Rating
AllMusic	3.5/5 stars
Entertainment Weekly	B
Paste	(favorable)
Rolling Stone	3/5 stars
Stylus	C

...Something to Be received mixed reviews from music critics. At Metacritic, which assigns a normalized rating out of 100 to reviews from mainstream critics, the album received an average score of 57, based on 11 reviews, which indicates "mixed or average reviews".

David Browne of Entertainment Weekly said Rob Thomas "sounds less like his usual tortured self and more like a boy-band veteran who still knows a thing or two about a grabby hook" and noting that the single "Streetcorner Symphony" sounds like "the world's greatest Black Crowes parody — until you realize Thomas is completely serious". Browne also commented that the album "doesn't always snap and crackle the way that single ("Lonely No More") does".

Lindsay Whitfield of Soul Shine Magazine also gave the album and some of its songs a positive review (four stars), saying the album is "one of the finest, most unique albums of 2006 so far" and Thomas belts out "musical perfection to the road trip worthy". Thomas Inskeep of Stylus Magazine gave the album a negative review (although the "C" rating reflects a more mixed attitude), calling it "mediocre" and explaining that the large part of the problem was that "Rob's a fairly generic songwriter". Inskeep continued by saying he is "one of the most processed-cheese-and-Wonder-bread guys around" and Thomas had "hopelessly clichéd lines" on the song "Ever the Same".

Kevin Forest Moreau of Paste gave the album a positive review, saying his debut solo album "certainly sounds different from the adult-alternative diet-rock of Matchbox Twenty-at least half the time". Moreau complimented the "punchy horns and a few electronic flourishes" for being on songs such as "Streetcorner Symphony". However, he criticized the "ponderous poetics...and platitudes" for being mistaken as depth. Paul Lingas of avrev.com called the album "a mixed bag with some surprisingly good offerings and some duds that sadly aren't surprising" (giving the performance a 5.5 and the sound 6.5), complimenting some of the songs but also calling them "background music". He noted that Thomas "does not have a good singing voice". Although he also called his voice very distinctive and strong, he said "too often it is not suited to the surrounding music". Lingas finished by saying that Thomas' voice is not always well blended with the other sounds and that the mixing is "poor" and producing decisions are "sometimes odd".

== Track listing ==
All tracks are written by Rob Thomas.

No.	Title	Writer(s)	Length
1.	"This Is How a Heart Breaks"	Thomas; Christian Karlsson; Henrik Jonback; Pontus Winnberg	3:50
2.	"Lonely No More"		3:47
3.	"Ever the Same"		4:16
4.	"I Am an Illusion"		4:53
5.	"When the Heartache Ends"		2:51
6.	"...Something to Be"		4:31
7.	"All That I Am"		4:28
8.	"Problem Girl"		3:55
9.	"Fallin' to Pieces"		4:11
10.	"My, My, My"		4:18
11.	"Streetcorner Symphony"	Thomas; Matt Serletic	4:09
12.	"Now Comes the Night"	Thomas; Serletic	4:55

iTunes deluxe version
No.	Title	Length
13.	"Not Just a Woman"	3:03
14.	"You Know Me"	3:48
15.	"This Is How a Heart Breaks" (Pull's Defibrillator Mix)	6:32
16.	"Lonely No More" (Clear Channel "Stripped" Mix)	3:44
17.	"Lonely No More" (music video)	3:45
18.	"Ever the Same" (music video)	4:04

Australian edition bonus tracks
No.	Title	Length
13.	"Not Just a Woman"	3:03
14.	"You Know Me"	3:48
15.	"Lonely No More" (Clear Channel Stripped Version)	3:44
16.	"This Is How a Heart Breaks" (Pull's Defibrillator Mix)	6:32

Japan edition bonus track
No.	Title	Length
13.	"Fallen"	4:36

=== Target bonus CD: ...Something More ===
No.	Title	Length
1.	"...Something to Be" (downtown version)
2.	"When the Heartache Ends" (piano version)
3.	"Not Just a Woman"
4.	"You Know Me"
5.	"Dear Joan"
6.	"Lonely No More" (Jason Nevins Rock Da Club Mix)
7.	"Lonely No More" (Francois L. Club Mix)

== Personnel ==
Musicians

- Harley Allen – background vocals (9)
- Greater Anointing – background vocals (1, 2, 7, 11)
- Matt Beck – background vocals (6)
- Mike Campbell – guitar (5, 6, 8, 9), guitar solo (8)
- Cassidy – background vocals (6, 10)
- Kyle Cook – guitar (6)
- Jill Dell'Abate – horn contractor
- Mike Elizondo – bass guitar (1–11)
- Anika Ellis – additional background vocals (11)
- Pat Enright – background vocals (9)
- Brandon Fields – saxophone (4, 6, 11)
- Gordon Gottlieb – marimba, bells, and orchestral drums (7)
- Gary Grant – trumpet (4, 6, 11)
- Jonathon Haas – marimba, bells, and orchestral drums (7)
- Benjamin Herman – marimba, bells, and orchestral drums (7)
- Jerry Hey – trumpet (6, 11), horn arrangements (6, 11)
- Gerald Hayward – drums (1–6, 8–11)
- Hasan Isakkut – kanun (7)
- Kevin Kadish – guitar (1)
- Frank London – shofar (7)
- John Mayer – guitar (11)
- Wendy Melvoin – guitar (1–9, 11)
- Joe Passaro – marimba, bells, and orchestral drums (7)
- Heitor Teixeira Pereora – guitar (3, 10)
- Eric Poland – marimba, bells, and orchestral drums (7)
- Robert Randolph – lap steel guitar (4)
- Matt Serletic – keyboards, background vocals (8, 10)
- Shari Sutcliffe – horn contractor
- Rob Thomas – lead vocals, piano (12)
- Jeff Trott – guitar (1–4, 7, 8, 11)
- Dan Tyminski – background vocals (9)
- Dan Willis – dudok (7)
- Reginald Young – trombone (6, 11)

Technical personnel

- Matt Serletic – producer
- Jimmy Douglass – engineer (1–6, 8–11), mixing (1, 3–6, 9, 11)
- Greg Collins – engineer (1–11)
- Mark Dobson – engineer (1–11), digital editing
- Jay Newland – engineer (7)
- David Thornier – engineer (12), mixing (2, 7, 8, 10, 12)
- Jon Belec – assistant engineer, mixing assistant
- Jason Dale – assistant engineer, mixing assistant
- Mark Gottlieb – assistant engineer
- John Morrical – assistant engineer
- Hal Winer – assistant engineer
- Kevin Mills – assistant engineer
- Gary Paczosa – additional recording (9)
- Zach McNees – mixing assistant
- Tony Maserati – additional mixing (2)
- John O'Brien – programming
- Bob Ludwig – mastering

== Charts ==
=== Weekly charts ===
Weekly chart performance for ...Something to Be
Chart (2005)	Peak position
Australian Albums (ARIA)	1
Austrian Albums (Ö3 Austria)	19
Canadian Albums (Billboard)	2
Danish Albums (Hitlisten)	16
Dutch Albums (Album Top 100)	64
French Albums (SNEP)	115
German Albums (Offizielle Top 100)	10
Hungarian Albums (MAHASZ)	37
New Zealand Albums (RMNZ)	14
Norwegian Albums (VG-lista)	13
Singaporean Albums (RIAS)	1
Spanish Albums (Promusicae)	70
Swedish Albums (Sverigetopplistan)	19
Swiss Albums (Schweizer Hitparade)	19
UK Albums (Official Charts)	11
US Billboard 200	1

=== Year-end charts ===
2005 year-end chart performance for ...Something to Be
Chart (2005)	Position
Australian Albums (ARIA)	15
US Billboard 200	46
Worldwide Albums (IFPI)	47

2006 year-end chart performance for ...Something to Be
Chart (2006)	Position
Australian Albums (ARIA)	95

== Certifications ==
Certifications for ...Something to Be
Region	Certification	Certified units/sales
Australia (ARIA)	3× Platinum	210,000^{^}
Canada (Music Canada)	Platinum	100,000^{^}
New Zealand (RMNZ)	Gold	7,500^{^}
United Kingdom (BPI)	Silver	60,000^{^}
United States (RIAA)	2× Platinum	2,000,000^{^}
^{^} Shipments figures based on certification alone.
