= After School Special (The Vampire Diaries) =

- The Vampire Diaries episode
- Episode no.: Season 4 Episode 10
- Directed by: David Von Ancken
- Written by: Brett Matthews
- Cinematography by: Dave Perkal
- Editing by: Joel T. Pashby
- Production code: 2J6660
- Original air date: January 17, 2013

Guest appearances
- Claire Holt as Rebekah Mikaelson; Marguerite MacIntyre as Liz Forbes; Rick Worthy as Rudy Hopkins; Nathaniel Buzolic as Kol Mikaelson; Grace Phipps as April Young; David Alpay as Atticus Shane

Episode chronology
| ← Previous "O Come, All Ye Faithful" | Next → "Catch Me If You Can" |
- The Vampire Diaries season 4

"After School Special" is the tenth episode of the fourth season of the American supernatural teen drama television series The Vampire Diaries, and the 76th of the series. It aired on The CW on January 17, 2013. The episode was written by co-producer Brett Matthews and directed by David Von Ancken.

== Plot ==
Following Carol's death, Bonnie's father steps in as the new mayor and shows concern about Bonnie. Meanwhile, Rebekah and April work together to get Elena to speak to Rebekah, trapping Elena in the library. Stefan is called to rescue Elena, and he calls Caroline for back up. Both are tricked and locked into the library with Elena, although Rebekah allows April to leave. Meanwhile, Matt and Damon continue training Jeremy to expand the hunter's mark. Klaus gets impatient and Damon shoots him several times for killing Carol. Regardless, Klaus offers to provide vampires for Jeremy to kill starting with a pizza delivery woman; she attacks them, forcing Jeremy to kill her. Bonnie talks to Shane, who gives her an amulet made from human bone. Kol soon shows up and abducts Shane, taking him to the school's library. Rebekah talks to them about the cure and more personally, to Elena about her break up with Stefan and her feelings for Damon, in an effort to torment Stefan. Tyler gets a call from Rebekah to rescue his friends. Kol brings in Shane and tortures him for the location of the cure. Shane tells Kol and Rebekah about Silas, and how he intends to release him and how Silas will resurrect those who died on his behalf.

Rebekah refuses to listen and Kol attempts to drown Shane and impales him, but Bonnie manages to put a protection spell on Shane; but April suffers from the spell due to a link between her and Shane. Tyler arrives and Rebekah compels him to turn into a werewolf. As Tyler begins to transform, he tells his friends to run for it. As they do, Stefan finds an unconscious April with Bonnie and manages to revive her, telling Bonnie to get her out. When Tyler turns back to his human form, Caroline finds him and he reveals that he blames himself for everything. Rebekah walks up to Elena and Stefan and offers to erase Stefan's memories of Elena, but when he accepts, Rebekah goes back on her word; saying that Stefan's pain is her own revenge.

At the end of the episode, April talks to the sheriff and the mayor, revealing that she knows about the supernatural and everyone's lies. Damon and Elena talk on the phone and Elena says that sire bond or not, she loves him. Damon tells her to meet him at the cabin. Rebekah comes to Stefan saying that she still wants the cure so she can use it on Klaus, and Stefan agrees to help her. Klaus calls Jeremy, Matt and Damon to a bar, full of people transforming into vampires.

== Reception ==
=== Ratings ===
When the episode aired on January 17, 2013, the episode was viewed by 2.95 million American viewers.
