= Waiting for Your Letter =

EP by Cary Brothers
- Released: September 20, 2005
- Recorded: 2005
- Genre: Indie rock
- Length: 17:43
- Label: Procrastination
- Producer: Chad Fischer

Cary Brothers chronology
All the Rage (2004)	Waiting for Your Letter (2005)	Who You Are (2007)

Waiting for Your Letter is the second EP by the American singer-songwriter Cary Brothers.

== Track listing ==
All songs written by Cary Brothers.

1. "Ride" - 3:15
2. "Waiting for Your Letter" - 2:30
3. "Loneliest Girl in the World" - 3:04
4. "Wasted One" - 4:45
5. "Forget About You" - 4:09
