= I'd Rather Be with You =

Single by Joshua Radin

from the album Simple Times
- Released: September 30, 2008 (US); April 2, 2010 (UK); June 7, 2010 (NL)
- Recorded: 2008
- Genre: Folk rock
- Length: 2:43
- Label: Mom + Pop
- Songwriter: Joshua Ryan

Joshua Radin singles chronology
| "I'd Rather Be with You" (2008) | "Brand New Day" (2010) |

"I'd Rather Be with You" is the debut single by Joshua Radin, taken from his second studio album Simple Times. It was released in the US on September 30, 2008 and in the UK on April 2, 2010. The song was used in the Scrubs episode "My Cookie Pants".

== Music videos ==
Two music videos have been produced to support the single's release. The first video, directed by Zach Braff and featuring Katrina Bowden, was released along with the US single release, whilst the second video, directed by Marc Klasfeld & Tony Petrossian and featuring Hayden Panettiere, was released to coincide with the UK release.

== Critical reception ==
Nick Levine of Digital Spy gave the song a positive review stating:

You might not have heard of Joshua Radin yet, but if you're fond of quality telly from the land of the free, chances are you'll know some of his music. Since releasing his debut album in 2006, the Ohio-born singer-songwriter has enjoyed almost as much exposure on top US TV shows as Alan "Jim from Neighbours" Dale – with no fewer than seven of his tunes featuring on Scrubs alone.

Listening to 'One of Those Days', his UK debut single, it's not hard to work out why. An elegantly-constructed, string-swathed toe-tapper with a whiff of the Jack Johnson to it (damp salty wetsuit?), its tender sentiments are perfect for that moment when it looks like the guy might just get the gal. "I'd rather be with you," Radin croons soothingly, "Say you feel the same way too." Like a good long soak in the tub, this may not be terribly exciting, but it's cosy, warming and just what the doctor ordered after a stressful bus ride home.

== Chart performance ==
On September 27, 2008, the song only managed to peak to number 82 in the US and on the October 4, 2008 the single peaked to number 61 in Canada and then dropped out of the top 100 the next week. The single debuted on April 11, 2010 on the UK Singles Chart at a current peak of number 11, almost managing to enter the UK Top 10. Despite receiving downloads from the album as well, the following week, the single remained at number 11.

| Chart (2008) | Peak position |
|---|---|
| Canada Hot 100 (Billboard) | 61 |
| US Billboard Hot 100 | 82 |
| US Digital Song Sales (Billboard) | 39 |
| Chart (2009) | Peak position |
| Australia (ARIA) | 91 |
| Chart (2010) | Peak position |
| UK Singles (Official Charts) | 11 |
| Sweden (Sverigetopplistan) | 34 |
