= Ever the Same =

2005 single by Rob Thomas

Single by Rob Thomas

from the album ...Something to Be
- Released: November 7, 2005
- Length: 4:17 (album version); 3:51 (radio edit)
- Label: Atlantic
- Songwriter: Rob Thomas
- Producer: Matt Serletic

Rob Thomas singles chronology
"This Is How a Heart Breaks" (2005)	"Ever the Same" (2005)	"...Something to Be" (2006)

"Ever the Same" is the third single from Matchbox Twenty frontman Rob Thomas's 2005 debut album, ...Something to Be. The song was released on November 7, 2005, and received a gold certification from the Recording Industry Association of America (RIAA). It has been used in commercials for NBA Cares.

== Song ==
"Ever the Same" is a ballad that Rob Thomas wrote for his wife, Marisol Maldonado. For several years, she battled a serious illness that doctors were unable to identify. According to Thomas, Maldonado was "so frustrated by it that she would keep me at bay because she felt she'd be bringing me down." After one particularly painful day, she cried herself to sleep in his arms. He wrote the song, a promise that he would always be there no matter how tough life got, that evening. Thomas says that "It all stemmed from the line: 'Just let me hold you while I'm falling apart.'"

The music has a decided 80s music feel. Thomas describes it as appropriate to play in the last five minutes of a John Hughes film.

== Music video ==
The music video, directed by Phil Harder, features various shots mixed against a drawn and partially colored city background, interspliced with shots of Thomas singing the song. The music video features Wilmer Valderrama. Wilmer's character is a dove keeper who writes messages of hope and attaches them onto the doves legs before allowing them to fly off. As the video progresses, different people all over the city receive these tiny notes. Rob Thomas's wife Marisol is also featured in this video, playing a woman who lives in the apartment adjacent to Rob's. Both Rob and Wilmer look up to see her standing on the edge of her window ledge, presumably thinking about jumping off (most likely in a moment of despair). Wilmer then releases a dove to Marisol, who stops to read the note, smiling and taking seat on the ledge. She eventually jumps off from the ledge, transforming midway into a dove. Rob Thomas, who is out taking his dog for a walk, is sitting on a bench when the dove that once was Marisol lands beside him. He takes the message from its leg and then releases her. The video ends with crowds of people staring up in wonder as Wilmer's flock of doves color the sky and Marisol returning to Wilmer while Rob watches from his window.

== Charts ==
=== Weekly charts ===
Chart (2005–2006)	Peak position
Australia (ARIA)	29
Canada AC Top 30 (Radio & Records)	3
Canada Hot AC Top 30 (Radio & Records)	1
New Zealand (Recorded Music NZ)	34
Ukraine Airplay (TopHit)	105
US Billboard Hot 100	48
US Adult Contemporary (Billboard)	4
US Adult Pop Airplay (Billboard)	2
US Pop 100 (Billboard)	47
US Pop Airplay (Billboard)	33

=== Year-end charts ===
Chart (2006)	Position
US Adult Contemporary (Billboard)	6
US Adult Top 40 (Billboard)	3

== Sales and certifications ==
Region	Certification	Certified units/sales
United States (RIAA)	Gold	500,000^{^}
^{^} Shipments figures based on certification alone.

== Release history ==
Region	Date	Format(s)	Label(s)	Ref.
United States	November 7, 2005	Adult contemporary; hot adult contemporary radio	Atlantic	
Australia	November 14, 2005	CD	Atlantic	
United States	March 6, 2006	Contemporary hit radio	Atlantic	
