= Simple Times =

Studio album by Joshua Radin
- Released: September 9, 2008
- Genres: Acoustic, folk rock
- Length: 33:42
- Label: Mom + Pop Music

Joshua Radin chronology
We Were Here (2006)	Simple Times (2008)	The Rock and the Tide (2010)

Simple Times is the second studio album by American folk musician Joshua Radin. It was released on September 9, 2008 on iTunes and in stores on September 30, 2008. It has a release date of 12 April 2010 on the UK iTunes Store. The UK release features radio edits of "One Of Those Days", "I'd Rather Be with You", and "Brand New Day", all slightly shorter than the U.S. album versions.

== Music video ==
A music video for the song "I'd Rather Be with You" was released in November 2008, directed by Zach Braff. A second video for "I'd Rather Be with You" starring Hayden Panettiere was released in early 2010.

== Track listing ==
1. "One of Those Days" - 3:04
2. "I'd Rather Be with You" - 2:49
3. "Sky" (feat. Meiko) - 3:30
4. "Friend Like You" - 2:20
5. "Brand New Day" - 3:31
6. "They Bring Me to You" (feat. Erin McCarley) - 3:58
7. "Vegetable Car" - 3:02
8. "Free of Me" - 2:35
9. "You Got Growin' Up to Do" (feat. Patty Griffin) - 2:55
10. "We Are Okay" - 2:41
11. "No Envy, No Fear" - 3:22

== Reception ==
=== Critical ===
Professional ratings
Review scores
Source	Rating
Allmusic	3/5 stars
BBC	average
CHARTattack	3.5/5 stars

AllMusic reviewer Andrew Leahey gave the album three out of five stars, calling it "a warm, easygoing album geared for Sunday afternoons and Monday mornings," but noting that "Radin still struggles with the balance between mood and melody." Giving the album two-and-a-half stars out of four, Chuck Arnold with People magazine said that Radin "delivers on modest pleasures like 'I'd Rather Be with You,' even if he never really blows you away." The BBC also offered a mixed review: "Despite its accomplished shine, too much of Simple Times follows a terribly predictable path, to the extent where Radin’s words fade into the background hubbub of one’s daily grind." Paste magazinegave the album a 6.8 out of 10, noting that "it sticks to his formula of pensive, vaguely introspective lyrics echoed through his hushed, whisper-thin voice, peppered with wistful piano and string arrangements," and calling "They Bring Me To You" a "stunning standout, with pitch-perfect vocals from Erin McCarley that melt in tune with Radin's."

=== Charts ===
The album debuted at number 34 on the Billboard 200, selling about 14,000 copies in its first week.

Chart (2008)	Peak position
US Billboard 200	34
Chart (2010)	Peak position
UK Albums Chart	9
