= The Rock and the Tide =

Studio album by Joshua Radin
- Released: October 12, 2010
- Recorded: 2009–2010
- Genre: Acoustic, folk rock
- Label: Mom + Pop Music

Joshua Radin chronology
Simple Times (2008)	The Rock and the Tide (2010)	Underwater (2012)

The Rock and the Tide is the third studio album by American folk musician Joshua Radin. It was released on October 12, 2010.

== Background ==
Most of the songs were played at live venues for a couple of years before the official release. The original release date was said to be during February 2010 but was postponed due to an official release of the second album 'Simple Times' in the UK.

== Release and promotion ==
Joshua promoted the album on The Ellen DeGeneres Show on October 12, the day of the album's release. In promotion of the album, Radin began touring with the Irish band The Script that same month.

The album achieved moderate success in America upon its release, peaking at number 31 on the Billboard Top 200 in late October. It peaked at number 5 in the Billboard Independent Albums, spending three weeks in the chart while also peaking at number 9 in the Billboard Rock Albums. It sold 13,000 copies in its first week.

== Reception ==
Chuck Arnold, with People magazine said that "There's nothing here that hasn't been done better by John Mayer, Jack Johnson and Damien Rice. Still, Rock is solid sensitive-male stuff," and ultimately gave the album two-and-a-half stars out of four.

== Track listing ==
1. "Road to Ride On" (3:03)
2. "Streetlight" (3:29)
3. "Here We Go" (4:00)
4. "We Are Only Getting Better" (4:02)
5. "The Rock and the Tide" (4:03)
6. "You Got What I Need" (3:05)
7. "Nowhere to Go" (4:18)
8. "Think I'll Go Inside" (4:17)
9. "The Ones With the Light" (3:26)
10. "You're Not as Young" (2:57)
11. "One Leap" (3:21)
12. "Wanted" (2:53)
13. "Brand New Day - Reprise" (3:14)
14. "She Belonged to Me" [iTunes-only Bonus Track] (3:30)

=== UK release ===
The UK release differs in that it does not feature the songs "Nowhere to Go", "You're Not as Young", "One Leap", the reprised version of "Brand New Day" and "She Belonged to Me". The track order also differs slightly. The song "I Missed You" is exclusive to the UK release.

1. "Road to Ride On" (3:02)
2. "Streetlight" (3:33)
3. "I Missed You" (3:20)
4. "The Ones With the Light" (3:22)
5. "You Got What I Need" (3:03)
6. "We Are Only Getting Better" (4:00)
7. "Think I'll Go Inside" (4:17)
8. "Here We Go" (3:58)
9. "Wanted" (2:47)
10. "The Rock and the Tide" (4:03)

== Charts ==
Chart (2010–2011)	Peak position
UK Albums Chart	59
UK Digital Albums Chart	34
US Billboard 200	31
US Billboard Independent Albums	5

== Release history ==
Region	Date	Format	Label
Australia	June 10, 2011	CD, digital download	Mom and Pop Records
United Kingdom	August 1, 2011	CD, digital download	Mom and Pop Records
United States	October 12, 2010	CD, digital download, LP	Mom and Pop Records
