= First Between 3rd and 4th =

EP by Joshua Radin
- Released: July 2004
- Genres: Acoustic, folk rock
- Producers: Chad Fischer, Cary Brothers

Joshua Radin chronology
First Between 3rd and 4th (2004)	We Were Here (2006)

First Between 3rd and 4th is an EP independently released in July 2004 by singer/songwriter Joshua Radin.

== Overview ==
The EP, his debut, features the song "Winter", a song that through Radin's friend Zach Braff found its way into an episode of Braff's television show Scrubs in early 2004; the resulting publicity prompted the EP's release.

Both "Winter" and "Today" were released on Radin's 2006 full-length album We Were Here. The EP also features a cover version of "Girlfriend In A Coma", a 1987 single by The Smiths.

== Track listing ==
All songs written by Joshua Radin except "Girlfriend In A Coma" by Johnny Marr and Morrissey

1. "Winter" - 3:28
2. "Girlfriend In A Coma" - 2:49
3. "Don't Look Away" - 3:37
4. "Today" - 3:37
5. "The One You Knew" - 3:01
6. "Do You Wanna" - 2:43

== Personnel ==
- Joshua Radin - Guitar, Vocals, Cover Painting
- Chad Fisher - Percussion, Drums, Piano, Keyboards, Co-producer, Engineer, Mixing, Mastering
- Cary Brothers - Guitar, Backing Vocals, Co-producer
- Jason Kanakis - Guitar, Bass
- Bonnie Somerville - Backing Vocals
- John Krovosa - Cello
- Gabrielle Gewirtz - Graphics Design
- Zach Braff - triangle on the song "Today", Photography

== In popular culture ==
- The song "Winter" was featured at the end of "My Screw Up", a third season episode of Scrubs.
- The song "Today" was featured on "My Lucky Charm", a fourth season episode of Scrubs.
- The song "Don't Look Away" was featured on "My Big Move", also a fourth season episode of Scrubs.
- The song "The One You Knew" was featured on "Waiting For That Day", a first season episode of Eli Stone.
