= Under Control (album) =

Studio album by Cary Brothers
- Released: April 6, 2010
- Genre: Indie rock
- Length: 42:05
- Label: Procrastination
- Producer: Greg Collins

Cary Brothers chronology
Who You Are (2007)	Under Control (2010)	Bruises (2018)

Under Control is the second studio album by American indie rock singer Cary Brothers, released on April 6, 2010.

== Track listing ==
1. "Ghost Town" - 3:43
2. "Under Control" - 4:15
3. "Break Off the Bough" - 4:21
4. "After the Fall" - 4:30
5. "Someday" - 4:35
6. "Belong" - 4:16
7. "Over & Out" - 3:42
8. "Alien" - 4:43
9. "Something About You" - 3:46
10. "Can't Take My Eyes Off You" - 4:15
11. "Skyway" (Solo Acoustic) [Bonus track] - 3:46
12. "Forget About You" (Piano Demo) [Bonus track] - 4:15
