= The Bright Side (Meiko album) =

Studio album by Meiko
- Released: May 15, 2012
- Genres: Indie pop, indie folk, folktronica
- Length: 40:25
- Label: Fantasy

Meiko chronology
Meiko (2007)	The Bright Side (2012)	Dear You (2014)

The Bright Side is the second album by American singer Meiko, released through Fantasy Records on May 15, 2012. It is her first album under the Concord Music Group label. The lead single, "Stuck on You", was used in a 2012 Crate & Barrel nationwide ad campaign, their first in five years.

== Track listing ==
1. "Stuck on You" (3:06)
2. "I'm in Love" (3:46)
3. "When the Doors Close" (3:50)
4. "Thinking Too Much" (3:36)
5. "Leave the Lights On" (4:08)
6. "Lie to Me" (3:40)
7. "I'm Not Sorry" (3:16)
8. "Let It Go" (3:46)
9. "Real Real Sweet" (3:45)
10. "Good Looking Loser" (3:56)
11. "I Wonder" (3:36)
12. "Saddest Song, In The World" (4:55) (Itunes Only Bonus Track)

== Charts ==
=== Album ===
Chart (2012)	Peak position
US Americana/Folk Albums (Billboard)	6
US Heatseekers Albums (Billboard)	4

=== Singles ===
Chart (2012)	Peak position	Song
Japan Hot 100	3	Stuck on You
