= Catch Me If You Can (The Vampire Diaries) =

- The Vampire Diaries episode
- Episode no.: Season 4 Episode 11
- Directed by: John Dahl
- Written by: Brian Young; Michael Narducci
- Cinematography by: Dave Perkal
- Editing by: Tyler Cook
- Production code: 2J6661
- Original air date: January 24, 2013

Guest appearances
- Claire Holt as Rebekah Mikaelson; Marguerite MacIntyre as Liz Forbes; Rick Worthy as Rudy Hopkins; Nathaniel Buzolic as Kol Mikaelson; David Alpay as Atticus Shane

Episode chronology
← Previous "After School Special"	Next → "A View to a Kill"
- The Vampire Diaries season 4

"Catch Me If You Can" is the eleventh episode of the fourth season of the American supernatural teen drama television series The Vampire Diaries, and the 77th of the series. It aired on The CW on January 24, 2013. The episode was written by producers Brian Young and Michael Narducci, and directed by John Dahl.

== Plot ==
At a bar, Jeremy refuses to kill the new vampires. Klaus threatens to force them to attack Matt, so Jeremy would kill them. Since the new vampires will smell the injured Matt's blood (and probably attack) he and Jeremy try to escape. Although they are attacked, Elena intervenes and they reach the lake house. The next day, Elena scolds Damon for using innocent people; the vampires (controlled by Klaus) will return soon and Damon says, "Jeremy needs to finish the job." Rebekah visits Stefan, telling him she has a plan to steal Silas's headstone (and forcing Shane to join them). After Shane tells Bonnie she is in control, Sheriff Forbes arrests him with information from the mayor (Bonnie's father). Damon and Jeremy return to the bar and discover the vampires have been killed by Klaus and Rebekah's brother Kol, who tells them that 200 years ago he killed a Silas-worshiping cult and he does not want Silas to re-awaken. When he tries to tear off Jeremy's arms Damon attacks him, allowing Jeremy to escape.

Bonnie's father tells her that Shane manipulates the weak-minded. In the interrogation room, Shane confesses to Bonnie his murder of the 12 Founders Council members. Elena and Matt return to Mystic Falls, receiving a call from Jeremy about Kol's attack and Damon's capture. Elena asks Klaus to call off Kol, reminding him that they both want the cure; he tells Kol to stay away from Jeremy and release Damon. Kol instead tortures Damon into killing Jeremy. In Shane's study Rebekah and Stefan look for the headstone, reminiscing about their relationship. Rebekah says they had fun, and tells Stefan to stop caring. A man appears, telling them that the headstone is behind a panel, and Rebekah grabs him by the throat. With the interrogation-room cameras off, Bonnie confronts Shane about the murders. He tells her that he killed them as part of a ritual, and Silas will resurrect them when he awakens. She calls him crazy, before Shane reminds her that she can see her grandmother again. When Bonnie attacks him with magic, Shane tells her father that she can be the most powerful witch on earth or a time bomb

Elena visits Jeremy, who tries not to kill her. Damon arrives, telling Elena he wants to make amends to Jeremy, and they go to the Mystic Grill (where he and Matt are). Damon approaches Jeremy, who goes into an isolated storage room. Deducing that Kol ordered him to kill Jeremy, Damon warns Elena to keep him away from her brother. He follows Jeremy down a passageway under the bar, warning Jeremy that he has been sent to kill him. In Shane's study, Rebekah tortures the man (who kills himself by biting off his tongue). Although Elena asks Stefan for help, he seems indifferent. Jeremy shoots Damon in the head and escapes;

Kol returns to town and meets Rebekah, who tries to stab him but is stopped by Klaus. In the forest Elena unsuccessfully tries to use her feelings to persuade Damon to ignore the compulsion, but he stops when Stefan subdues him. Stefan returns Damon to the Salvatore house, imprisoning him and telling him that they can do what they want. Elena appears, but Stefan forbids her from seeing Damon. When he tells her he does not love her, she says he is lashing out. Over dinner with Bonnie her father says that he is going to get help for her, since her magic is out of control. At the Gilbert house Klaus says he intends to take Jeremy with him to protect him from Kol, but Elena and Jeremy refuse. When Stefan asks Rebekah about the headstone, she asks if he is over Elena; when he says "yes", they have sex. At the Gilbert house, Elena and Jeremy plot to kill Kol.

== Reception ==
When the episode aired on January 24, 2013, it was seen by 2.71 million American viewers.
