= A View to a Kill (The Vampire Diaries) =

- The Vampire Diaries episode
- Episode no.: Season 4 Episode 12
- Directed by: Brad Turner
- Written by: Rebecca Sonnenshine
- Cinematography by: Dave Perkal
- Editing by: Nathan Easterling
- Original air date: January 31, 2013

Guest appearances
- Claire Holt as Rebekah Mikaelson; Rick Worthy as Rudy Hopkins; Nathaniel Buzolic as Kol Mikaelson; Persia White as Abby Bennett Wilson

Episode chronology
| ← Previous "Catch Me If You Can" | Next → "Into the Wild" |
- The Vampire Diaries season 4

"Stand By Me" is the twelfth episode of the fourth season of the American supernatural teen drama television series The Vampire Diaries, and the 78th of the series. It aired on The CW on January 31, 2013. The episode was written by executive story editor Rebecca Sonnenshine and directed by Brad Turner.

== Plot ==
The morning after Stefan wakes up to remember he slept with Rebekah the night before. He tries to sneak out of her room without being noticed but before he Could he finds Klaus standing outside Rebekah's door. He is there to discuss how to stop Kol, who has the White Oak stake along with the daggers that Klaus had. He orders Rebekah to hand over the last dagger that is in her possession along with the White Oak ashes that she obtained from Klaus. When Rebekah won't help Klaus stop Kol and save Jeremy, Klaus turns to his old friend, Stefan, for help. Telling him to talk to Rebekah. But Stefan has other pressing matters like keeping Damon on lockdown after being compelled to kill Jeremy (by Kol). Klaus informs Stefan that this is why they have to find Kol or they could kiss their key to the map goodbye. Klaus reminds Stefan that with along daggering Kol, they end Damon's compulsion. Then Jeremy could continue killing Vampires and they could retrieve the cure for Elena. Which will then be a happily ever after for everyone.

Bonnie has been in charge of taking Caroline's place in the preparations for the decades dance. Elena is at home with Jeremy making sure that he is safe, alongside Matt. Elena informs Bonnie that she wants Jeremy to kill Kol, because she believes that if he kills him then all of Kol's sire line will die and all of the vampires they turned will also die. Making it so that thousands of vampires die at once, thus causing Jeremy to complete the hunters mark. Which in turn gets them the key to the cure. Bonnie agrees to help. While washing dishes Elena's hands are burned and they realize that Mayor Hopkins has put Vervain in the water supply of Mystic Falls. This causes Bonnie to have an angry confrontation with her father. He informs her that he is reinstating the town curfew and canceling all the town events. Which includes the decades dance. Bonnie tells her dad that she had been protecting the town without his help just fine and that it is her job to do so. He calls her home for a family meeting. Kol threatens Bonnie telling her that no one could get to the cure if she is too dead to find it. Bonnie starts to break all the bones in Kol's body until she realizes that she is not in control anymore.

Klaus increases the tension between Damon and Stefan by revealing that Stefan slept with Rebekah and that Stefan is over Elena. Klaus is left babysitting Damon in the basement of the Salvatore house while Stefan goes to retrieve the dagger for Rebekah. Elena calls Stefan and informs him that Kol tried to kill Bonnie and that she doesn't just want to dagger Kol but, she wants Jeremy to kill him. Stefan doesn't agree with her. And he says Klaus and Rebekah's dysfunctional bickering is lunatic, but they stick together no matter what. Elena convinces Stefan that she needs to find the dagger and use it on Rebekah. And Stefan agrees to help.

Elena calls Kol and tells him that she needs to talk to him in person, that she wants to call a truce in the name of Silas. Kol arrives at her house and demands to be invited inside in order to call the truce. Jeremy actually ends up inviting Kol in, but then runs out of the house leaving Elena alone with Kol.

Stefan goes to see Rebekah to retrieve the dagger from her. She asks Stefan if he regrets sleeping with her and he says that he does not. She asks if he would want it to happen again and he replies maybe. She questions him, asking if he would still do it if she would refuse to give up the dagger? He tells her that he wouldn't sleep with her just for the dagger and she replies with, "You have done plenty to me in the name of getting what you want." Stefan takes Rebekah to the dance even though it has been cancelled. Giving her somewhat of a first experience at a school dance.

Klaus blames Damon for all of the failed attempts at making Jeremy complete the hunters mark. Damon informs Klaus that he could have Jeremy wanting to kill Elena every time he saw her. Klaus taunts Damon saying that there has to be an explanation for Elena overlooking all of the horrible things that Damon has done to her and the people she loves. That it couldn't just be the sire bond. And accuses Damon of either compelling her, manipulating her, or maybe even just wilful ignorance on Elena's behalf. Damon is intrigued when Klaus asks for advice regarding Caroline. Klaus is worried because he killed Carol Lockwood, that Caroline will never forgive him. But then makes a comment about how Damon has done much worse and Elena still has feelings for him. Damon informs Klaus that he doesn't mind being that bad person because someone has to fill that role and get things. He tells Klaus that every bad thing that Klaus has done he has done it for no reason other than to torment and piss people off. He tells him that if he intends on being bad, to be bad with a purpose. Otherwise he is just not worth forgiving.

Elena keeps Kol occupied informing him that she has renounced her alliance with Klaus and that she will give up looking for the cure if he promises to leave Jeremy alone. Elena shares with Kol about killing Conner. Kol tells her that over the years you lose track of how many people you kill. Kol tells Elena that he believe Silas exists because he used to run with some witches in Africa in the 14th century, Haiti in the 17th century, and New Orleans in the 1900s and they all knew about Silas and how he had to stay buried. Kol shares the myth about Silas, that if he was to raise he would unleash hell on earth. Elena refers to it being biblical and Kol tells her that in the process of time people lose faith and they no longer know who they should fear. Jeremy keeps calling Bonnie but has no luck in reaching her. Matt is searching Rebekah's house for the dagger in order to get it to Stefan so he can kill Rebekah.

Bonnie is at home with her father, who tells her about what Shane said about her being a time bomb. Bonnie tells her dad that Shane is crazy. He reminds Bonnie that he lost Abby, Bonnie's mother, to witchcraft and that he doesn't intend on losing her too. Jeremy shows up to Bonnie's house interrupting her conversation with her father and asking her to leave. Rudy tries to stop her so she resorts to magic to allow herself to leave. As she tries to leave, her mother shows up telling her she isn't going anywhere. Abby asks Bonnie about professor Shane and what he has been teaching her. Jeremy tells her that Elena needs her help. Abby tells Jeremy that Bonnie is done helping Elena Gilbert and to get out. Jeremy tries attacking Abby but Bonnie is successful in calming him down and tells him to go.

When Kol tries to cut off Jeremy's hands, Elena intervenes and Jeremy kills Kol with the White Oak Stake. Klaus sees this, and threatens to burn the home to ground and that he is no longer worried about the cure or his hybrids.

Meanwhile, Stefan tells Rebekah that Kol is dead and she is upset. But Stefan convinces her to stay so she can get the cure and be a human as she wished for. Stefan gets Silas’ headstone, and Elena is mad that Stefan did not dagger Rebekah, but rather trusting that Rebekah is on their side. Stefan and Damon gets into argument when Damon reveals that Stefan slept with Rebekah.

After the 1980s Decade Dance is cancelled by Mayor Hopkins, Stefan finds a charming way to make it up to Rebekah.

== Reception ==
=== Ratings ===
When the episode aired on January 31, 2013, the episode was viewed by 2.56 million American viewers.
