= Ride (Cary Brothers song) =

Single by Cary Brothers and Tiësto
- Released: March 25, 2008
- Recorded: 2007
- Genre: Folk; rock; progressive trance; house
- Length: 3:41 (album version)
- Label: Bluhammock Music; SongBird; Black Hole
- Songwriter: Cary Brothers
- Producers: Chad Fischer; Tiësto (remix)

Cary Brothers singles chronology
| "Who You Are" (2007) | "Ride" (2008) |

Tiësto singles chronology
| "Break My Fall" (2007) | "Ride" (2008) | "I Will Be Here" (2009) |

Alternative covers
- Procrastination US release

Alternative cover
- SongBird Netherlands release

Alternative cover
- Maelstrom UK release

"Ride" is a song from Cary Brothers' album Who You Are.

== Overview ==
Released on March 25, 2008, the song has gained great success in the mainstream and was released in 2008 as a single with a remix and a new music video by Dutch DJ Tiësto. Brothers performed "Ride" alongside Tiësto at the Bonnaroo Music and Arts Festival to promote each other's tours.

The remix charted 48 in the first week on the Billboard Hot Dance Club Play and it has reached 45 since then.

The remix was included as the opening track in Tiësto's Club Life on Radio 538 as well as on the podcast and on Tiësto's In Search of Sunrise 7: Asia compilation.

== Formats and track listings ==
CD, Maxi

1. "Ride" - 3:41
2. "Ride" (Tiësto Extended Remix) - 7:05
3. "Ride" (Tiësto Radio Edit) - 3:41
4. "Ride" (Live Version) - 3:32
5. "Ride" (Video) - 3:32
6. "Ride" (Tiësto Radio Edit) [Video] - 3:40

CD, Maxi, Promo

1. "Ride" (Tiësto Extended Remix) - 7:05
2. "Ride" (Tiësto Radio Edit) - 3:41
3. "Ride" (Video) - 3:32

CD, Maxi

1. "Ride" (Tiësto Radio Edit) - 3:42
2. "Ride" - 3:39
3. "Ride" (Tiësto Extended Remix) - 7:00
4. "Ride" (Video) - 3:32

12" Vinyl

1. "Ride" (Tiësto Extended Remix) - 7:05
2. "Ride" (Tiësto Radio Edit) - 3:41

== Personnel ==
- Mastered By: Michael Lazer
- Mixed By: Chad Fisher, Greg Collins
- Producer: Chad Fisher
- Remixer and Additional Producer: Tiësto
- Written By: Cary Brothers
- Photo By: Michael Muller
- Artwork and Design By: Hugo de Graaf (Songbird release)
- Published By: Procrastination Music (BMI)
- Produced At: Lookout Sound
- Mastered At: Paramount Recording Studios
- Music Video Produced By: Procrastination Music
- Music Video Directed By: Tyler Shields

== Charts ==
| Chart (2008) | Peak position |
|---|---|
| Billboard Hot Dance Club Play | 45 |

== Release history ==
| Date | Region | Label | Format | Catalog No |
|---|---|---|---|---|
| March 25, 2008 | United States | Bluhammock | File, MP3 | BLU80028 |
| April 1, 2008 | United States | Procrastination Music | File, MP3 | BLU80028 |
| July 8, 2008 | Netherlands | SongBird | CD, Maxi-Single, Enhanced, Cardsleeve, File, MP3 | Songbird 220-1 |
| July 11, 2008 | United Kingdom, Ireland | Maelstrom Records | File, MP3 | maeltbd093 |
