= Redneck Heaven =

Sports bar and restaurant chain in the United States

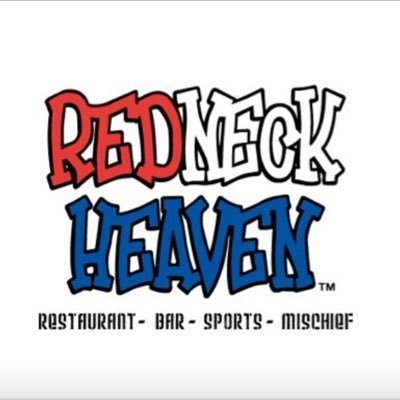
- Type: Private
- Industry: Restaurant
- Number of locations: 4 (at peak)
- Area served: Texas
- Services: Food and beverage
- Website: http://redneckheaven.com/ (archived)

Redneck Heaven was a chain of sports bars and restaurants based in Lewisville, Texas, and with locations in several other Texas cities. The chain was known for its controversial promotions, Southern theme and scantily-clad waitresses. It was the subject of an MTV reality show and it was frequently categorized as a breastaurant.

== History and concept ==
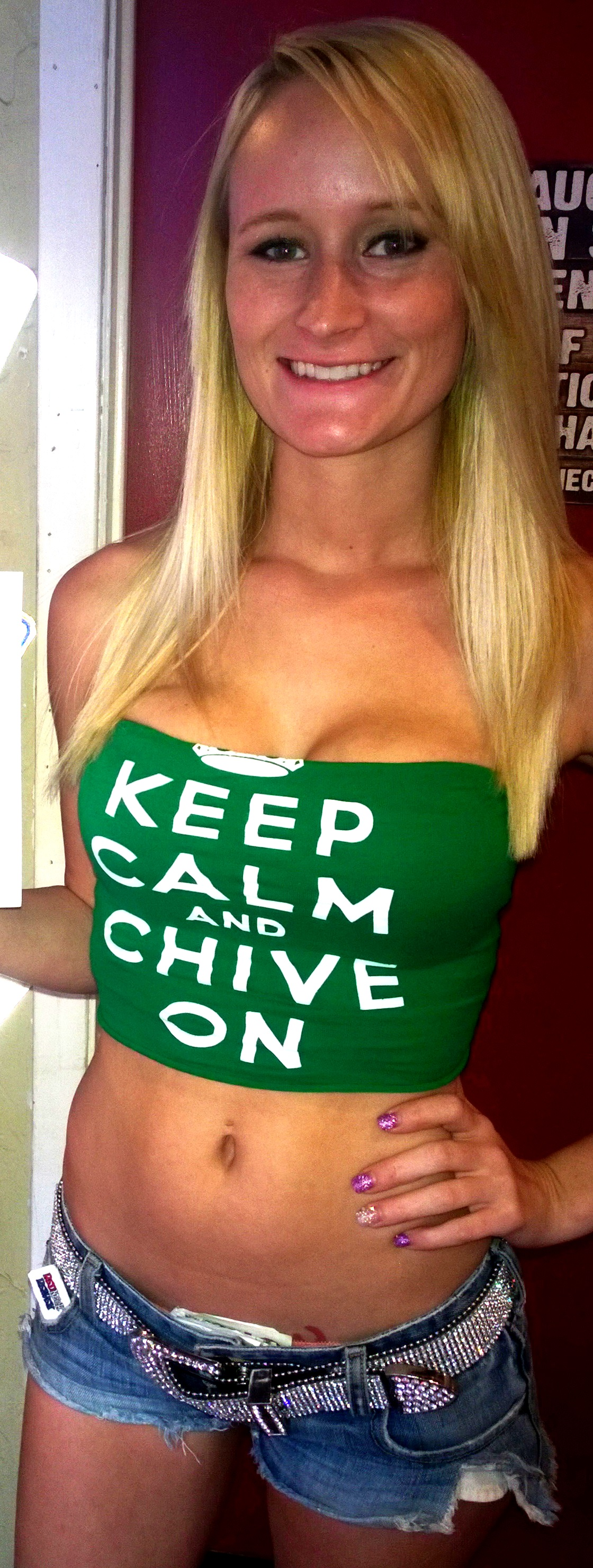
Redneck Heaven waitress wearing typical uniform (2013)

Opening in 2008 in Lewisville, Texas, Redneck Heaven marketed itself as a rowdier, more sexually provocative version of the typical breastaurant like Hooters, Tilted Kilt, or Twin Peaks. Restaurants featured Southern and Redneck-themed interior elements such as car doors from the General Lee (from The Dukes of Hazzard) and other automotive and sports memorabilia. They also featured scantily clad servers who engaged in what the chain termed as "mischief" (including line dancing, hula hooping and spanking).

The typical uniform consisted of skimpy cut-off shorts (resembling those of Dukes of Hazzard character Daisy Duke) with crop tops, bikini tops or bras. Redneck Heaven had many special events, however, where the typical attire was bikinis, lingerie or other themes. The chain also held "Anything But Clothes" events where servers wore only panties and body paint. Some reviewers characterized Redneck Heaven as bridging the gap between tamer breastaurants and strip clubs, though the owner said the experience had become less extreme since the early days of the restaurant. The Dallas Observer listed it as being one of the best bars in the Dallas-Fort Worth area.

== Big Tips Texas ==
During 2013, MTV ran a reality television series called Big Tips Texas. The show followed a number of Redneck Heaven waitresses from the Lewisville, Texas location and ran for 14 episodes (one season).

== Controversial promotions ==
=== Anything But Clothes ===
Redneck Heaven ran periodic "Anything But Clothes" events where waitresses were topless except for body paint covering their breasts. In response to this, at least three different municipalities in Texas changed their laws about what constitutes nudity, preventing body paint from being considered an "opaque covering". Classifying the waitresses as partially nude would have required that Redneck Heaven be regulated as a sexually oriented business.

=== Minnow Bombs ===
In addition to the regular menu, Redneck Heaven featured two unusual items which could be considered food challenges. One was a burger weighing 3 pounds (1,400 g) called the "Bubba's 'Tower in an Hour' Burger Challenge". The other, more controversial, item was a drink called the "Minnow Bomb". This drink consisted of a shot of liquor containing a live minnow. This item drew protests from the People for the Ethical Treatment of Animals (PeTA), who argued that it was both unsafe and inhumane to consume these live fish.
