= We Were Here (Joshua Radin album) =

Studio album by Joshua Radin
- Released: June 13, 2006
- Genres: Acoustic, folk rock
- Label: Columbia
- Producer: Chris Holmes

Joshua Radin chronology
First Between 3rd and 4th (2004)	We Were Here (2006)	Simple Times (2008)

Professional ratings
Review scores
Source	Rating
Allmusic	3/5 stars
Rolling Stone	4/5 stars

We Were Here (2006) is the first full-length album by American singer-songwriter Joshua Radin. It reached #34 on the Top Heatseekers Chart. The singer-songwriter released a cover of the song "Only You" as a bonus song.

== Usage in media ==
The songs "Closer" and "Winter" are featured in the episodes "My Best Laid Plans" and "My Screw Up", respectively, in the American television program Scrubs.

"Winter" also features in the web series Jake and Amir episode "Amir's Birthday", Leverage, and season 2 episode "Fiona, Interrupted" of Shameless as well as in the movie Senior Year (2022 film).

"What if You" was in Catch and Release, starring Jennifer Garner and Timothy Olyphant.

== Videos ==
Radin's first music video for the song "Closer" was directed by Zach Braff.

== Track listing ==
All tracks are written by Joshua Radin, except "Only You" by Vince Clarke.

No.	Title	Length
1.	"Sundrenched World"	4:30
2.	"Star Mile"	3:59
3.	"Everything'll Be Alright (Will's Lullaby)"	2:43
4.	"These Photographs"	3:24
5.	"Closer"	2:45
6.	"Today"	3:29
7.	"Winter"	3:34
8.	"Someone Else's Life"	3:33
9.	"Amy's Song"	3:42
10.	"What If You"	4:36
11.	"Only You"	2:26

2007 digital bonus track
No.	Title	Length
12.	"Only You (Imogen Heap mix)"	2:37

== Personnel ==
- Joshua Radin – vocals, guitar
- Chris Holmes – guitar, bass, keyboards, tambora, producer, programming
- Priscilla Ahn – piano, vocals
- Chad Fischer – piano
- Jason Kanakis – guitar
- Solomon Snyder – bass
- Colette Alexander – cello
- John Krovoza – cello
- Oliver Kraus – cello
