= Big Tips Texas =

American documentary-style television series

- Genre: Docu-series
- Created by: Ross Breitenbach; Andy Meyer; Scot Thor
- Starring: Typhani; Amber; Claire; Sabrina; Kristyn; Morgan; Mimi; Jillian; Macy; Mercedez
- Country of origin: United States
- Original language: English
- No. of seasons: 1
- No. of episodes: 14

Production
- Executive producers: Ross Breitenbach; Shannon Fitzgerald; Tiffany Lea Williams
- Running time: 22 minutes
- Production companies: Breitenbach Creative + Media; 20 West Productions; MTV Production Development

Original release
- Network: MTV
- Release: October 9 – December 18, 2013

Big Tips Texas is an American documentary-style series that premiered October 9, 2013, on MTV. Over 14 episodes, it follows two groups of four old and six new employees at Redneck Heaven, a breastaurant in Lewisville, Texas.

== Concept ==
The show title is a double entendre of the phrases "big tips" (i.e., tipping, or a gratuity) and "big tits" (i.e., slang for breasts). The show was filmed at and around Redneck Heaven, a breastaurant in Lewisville, Texas. Before airing, Texas Monthly predicted that the show would "focus primarily on drinking, cussing, screwing, and fighting, with frequent subplots involving betrayal, name-calling, applying to Harvard, and other cable-friendly degradations of contemporary Gomorrah."

== Cast ==
Industry sources have reported the cast members were likely paid between $1,500 and $2,500 an episode in addition to their normal compensation and tips for working at the restaurant. Reviewers have noted that the cast was split between those described by MTV News as Redneck Heaven "veterans" (Sabrina, Typhani, Claire and Amber) and "new girls" (Kristyn, Macy, Jillian, Mimi, Mercedez and Morgan). All the employees were bartenders or waitstaff except Typhani, the head of marketing. Beyond these differences, cast members have been described by reviewers as being fairly similar in appearance and background.

== Episodes ==
No.	Title	Original release date	U.S. viewers (millions)
1	"Welcome to Redneck Heaven"	October 9, 2013	0.61
2	"Promotion Problems"	October 9, 2013	0.62
3	"Marketing Mayhem"	October 16, 2013	0.41
4	"Rumor Has It"	October 16, 2013	0.47
5	"True Lies"	October 23, 2013	N/A
6	"Redneck Etiquette"	October 30, 2013	N/A
7	"Cowgirl Camp Out"	November 6, 2013	N/A
8	"Bringing Down the House"	November 13, 2013	N/A
9	"Party Poopers"	November 20, 2013	N/A
10	"Relationship Rodeo"	November 27, 2013	N/A
11	"Make Ups And Break Ups"	December 4, 2013	N/A
12	"Texas Turmoil"	December 11, 2013	N/A
13	"Friendtervention"	December 18, 2013	N/A
14	"Cow Girl Up"	December 18, 2013	N/A

== Reception ==
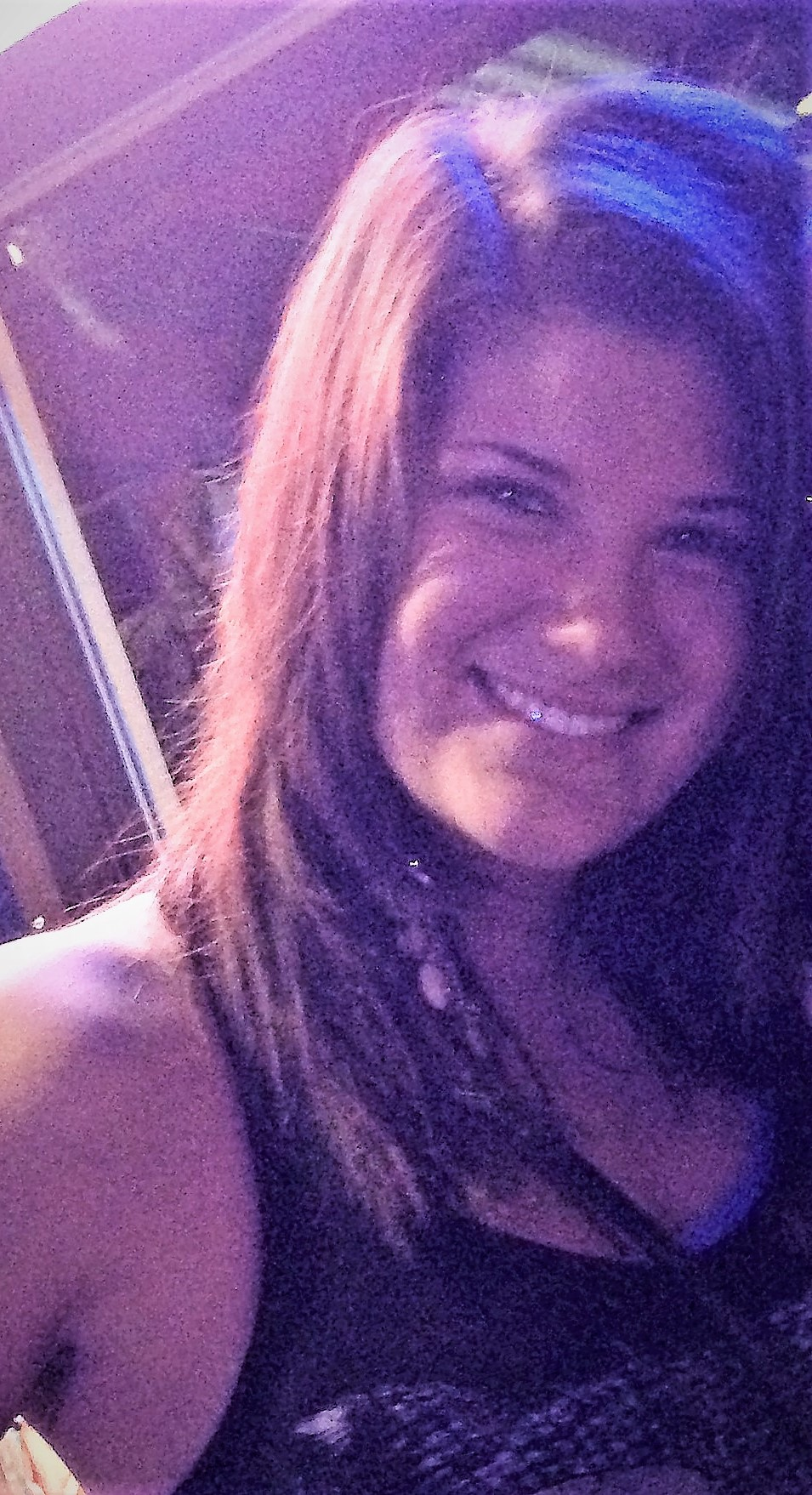
Cast member Amber Rosales in 2013

Variety magazine described Big Tips Texas as "Coyote Ugly: The Series". Brian Lowry categorized the Texas based show as an attempt to recreate the regional appeal of shows such as Duck Dynasty, Here Comes Honey Boo Boo, and Jersey Shore, but criticized the "dreary sameness to these characters and situations" and said that very little of the show seemed real.

Amy Kuperinsky at NJ.com gave the show a moderately positive review (a "B"), citing cast member Amber as a particular highlight of the show. Kuperinsky drew parallels between the dramatic alcohol-fueled antics of Amber and those of Nicole "Snooki" Polizzi from Jersey Shore. Kuperinsky wrote that one of the most memorable scenes involved a "Minnow Bomb" where a shot of alcohol was taken with a small live fish to be swallowed whole.

Belle Cushing of Grub Street mentioned the drama when the Lewisville, Texas city council moved to classify body paint (like that used during Anything But Clothes events at Redneck Heaven) as nudity and drew a connection between this and the drama of the show itself. Cushing was negative about the show's drama, however, describing it as being more than "anyone should be able to humanly stand."

Fox News was also harshly critical of Big Tips Texas. In discussing the show, Hollie McKay cited numerous sources which castigated Big Tips Texas' "need to sexualize...[and its] lowering of good taste." The review further criticized the notion that undressing for larger tips from customers should be considered hard work and called it an insult to women taking other, non-sexualized, career paths.
