= Joshua Radin =

American singer-songwriter (born 1974)

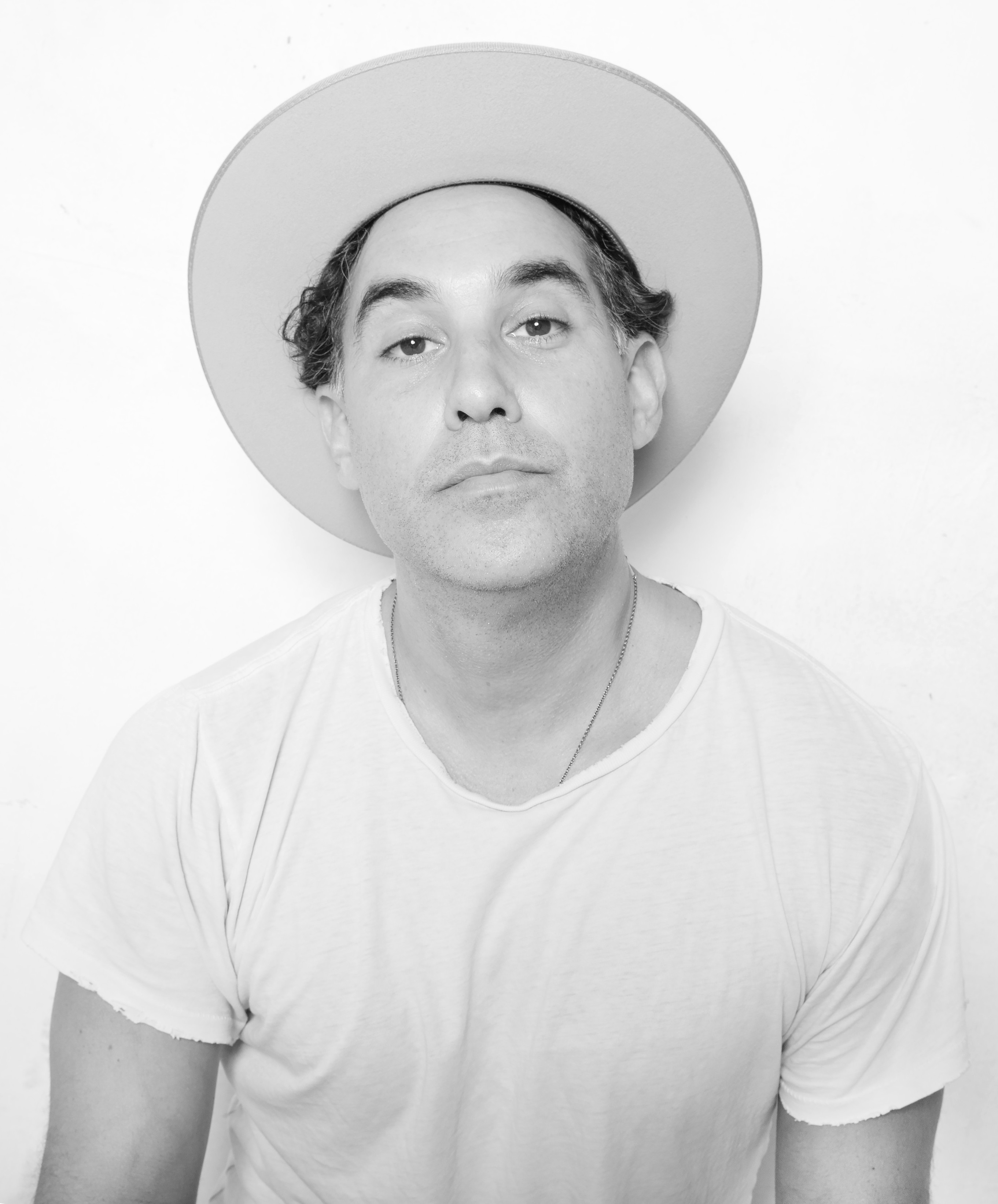
- Radin in 2017

Background information
- Born: June 14, 1974 (age 52)
- Origin: Cleveland, Ohio, U.S.
- Genres: Acoustic folk
- Occupations: Singer, songwriter
- Instruments: Acoustic guitar, electric guitar
- Years active: 2004–present
- Label: Mom + Pop Music
- Website: www.joshuaradin.com

Joshua Radin (born June 14, 1974) is an American singer-songwriter. He has recorded ten studio albums, and his songs have been used in a number of films and TV series. His most successful album, Simple Times, was released in 2008.

== Beginnings ==
Joshua Radin was born and raised in Shaker Heights, Ohio, United States, to a Jewish family of Polish, German, Austrian, and Russian background. He studied drawing and painting at Northwestern University, following his college years with stints as an art teacher, screenwriter, and art gallery employee.

Radin turned to music when he moved to New York City, his father bought him a guitar, and he taught himself to play and write music.

In 2004, American actor Zach Braff, a friend of Radin since their days at Northwestern, introduced Radin's first composition, "Winter", to Scrubs show creator Bill Lawrence, who ultimately used several of Radin's songs in various scenes of the television series.

== Musical career ==
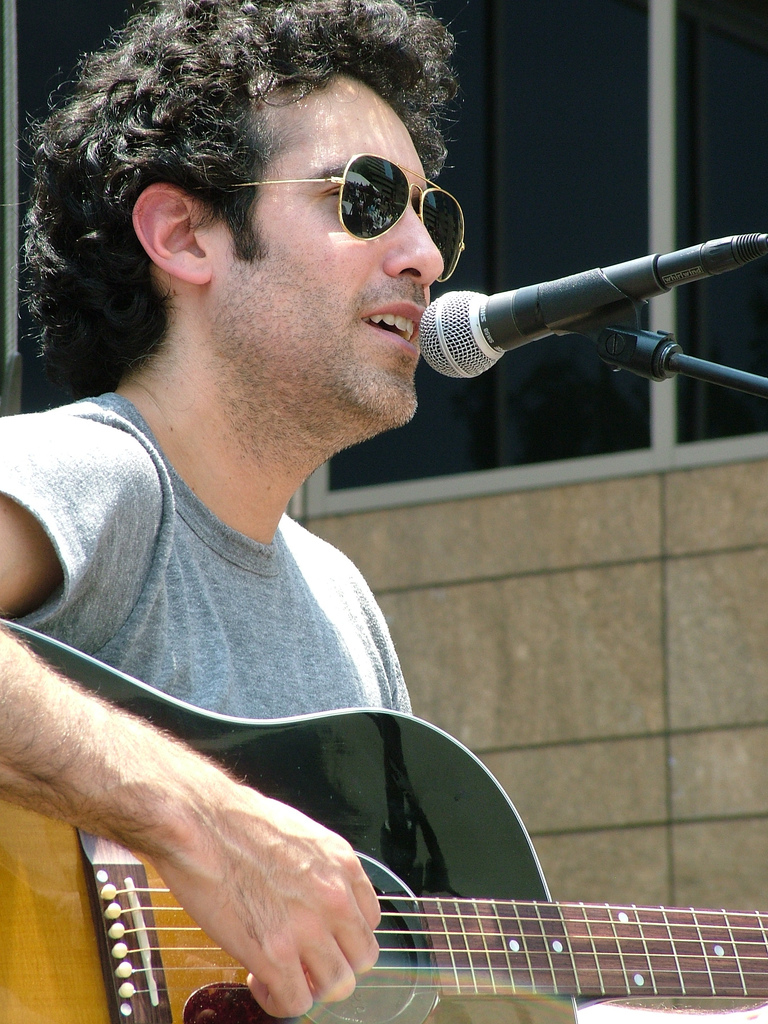
Radin in 2006

According to Radin his musical career started in 2004, and he had learned to play the guitar only two years before that. His first song, "Winter", appeared on his debut album We Were Here. Since that time, Radin has been touring the United States, as well as much of the United Kingdom and Europe. Over the course of his career, Radin has shared stages with artists such as Sheryl Crow, Tori Amos, Imogen Heap, Meiko, Missy Higgins, Maria Taylor, Gary Jules, Amber Rubarth, Schuyler Fisk, The Script and many more. In addition to his American following, Radin has enjoyed success with his 2008 release, Simple Times in the United Kingdom. His song "I'd Rather Be With You" reached No. 11 on the UK Singles Chart and number two on the US Top Digital Chart.

=== We Were Here (2006) ===
It's just the greatest music. He's a really talented guy. He's like the new Paul Simon.

— Zach Braff, 2006

Radin has said that much of the album was inspired by a bad break-up. It was released exclusively to iTunes for a month, before attracting attention from major labels. Released on Columbia Records in May 2006, We Were Here presented the first batch of songs Radin ever wrote. The album drew critical acclaim and received a four-star review from Rolling Stone, who praised it for Radin's "whispery, silver-bell voice" and its themes, calling them "poignant and refreshingly frank." The record hit number one on the iTunes Folk Album Chart and included a number of well known musicians, including Ryan Adams who played guitar on the song "Lovely Tonight". Zach Braff hand-picked one of the tracks to be featured on the soundtrack for The Last Kiss.

Radin played the song "Today" from the album, along with five other songs, for Ellen DeGeneres and Portia de Rossi at their August 16, 2008, wedding.

=== Simple Times (2008) ===
Radin's second album, Simple Times went straight to No. 1 on the iTunes overall chart upon its release. Radin enlisted highly regarded producer Rob Schnapf (Elliott Smith, Beck). The two spent seven weeks recording at L.A.'s legendary Sunset Sound Studio working with a cast of musicians that included guitarist Greg Leisz, bassist Johnny Flaugher, keyboardist Jason Borger, drummer Victor Indrizzo and percussionist Lenny Castro. Among the album's many highlights are "You Got Growin' Up To Do", featuring guest vocalist Patty Griffin, lead single "I'd Rather Be with You" and "Brand New Day". Tracks from the album were featured on TV shows such as Bones, Scrubs, House, Grey's Anatomy, One Tree Hill, Life Unexpected, 90210, Brothers and Sisters, American Idol and Australian hit series Packed to the Rafters among others. Radin's "Simple Times" was released on Mom + Pop Music.

=== The Rock and The Tide (2010) ===
Radin's third studio album, The Rock and The Tide was released on October 12, 2010, on Mom + Pop Music, his second release with the label. The album reached number five on the iTunes albums chart upon its release. The Rock and The Tide was produced by Martin Terefe (Cat Stevens, Ron Sexmith). A later EP released in 2011 used 6 of the album's tacks recorded in an acoustic session.

=== Underwater (2012) ===
On September 4, 2012, Radin released his fourth studio album, Underwater. The album was Radin's third release with Mom + Pop Music.

Radin wrote songs with Janet Devlin in the Autumn of 2012 for her debut album.

=== Wax Wings (2013) ===
Joshua Radin's fifth studio album Wax Wings was released May 7, 2013. Wax Wings, a self-released album, has eleven tracks. Included on the album is the song "Lovely Tonight", which had been previously released on iTunes as a single. The tracks "In Her Eyes" and "Stay" were produced by Matt Noveskey.

=== Onward and Sideways (2015) ===
Joshua Radin's released a sixth studio album on January 6, 2015. The album consisted of 13 tracks, one of which was a re-release of the Wax Wings track "Beautiful Day" recorded with Sheryl Crow.

=== The Fall (2017) ===
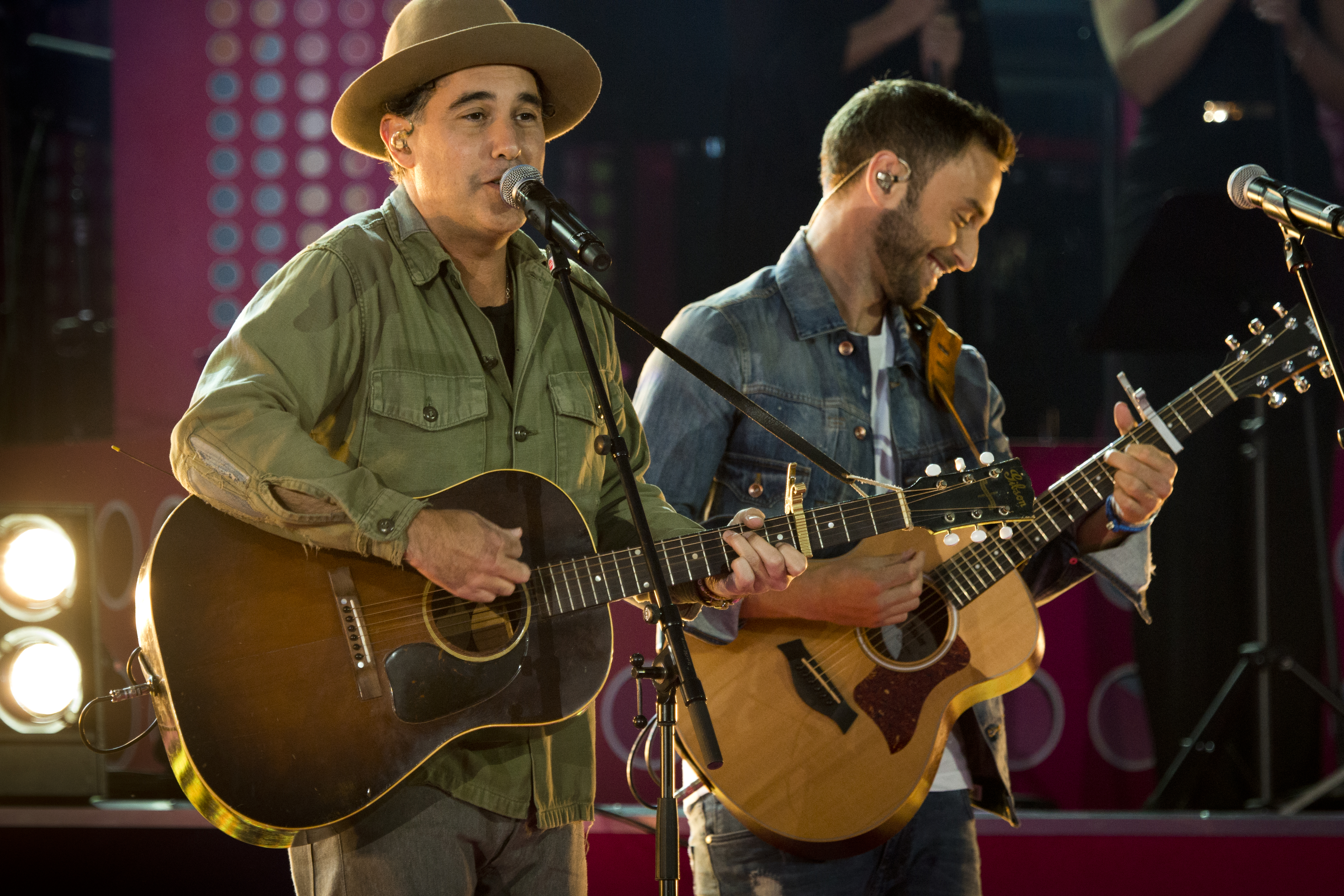
Radin (left) with Måns Zelmerlöw in 2016

Radin released a self-produced album titled The Fall on January 27, 2017, through Cadence Music.

=== Here, Right Now (2019) ===
Radin's eighth studio album, Here, Right Now, was released on October 4, 2019, through Nettwerk Music Group. It was his first album with Nettwerk. Here, Right Now features a cover of Tom Petty's I Won't Back Down.

=== The Ghost and The Wall (2021) ===
Joshua Radin's ninth full-length album, The Ghost and The Wall, was released on July 23, 2021. Radin wrote The Ghost and The Wall at his home in Los Angeles in 2020, in isolation during the early days of the COVID-19 pandemic. The album was produced remotely via email and text messages with Jonathan Wilson, who also played several instruments on the album. The two musicians have never met in person.

=== ONE DAY, HOME (2025) ===
Radin's tenth studio album, ONE DAY, HOME, was self-released on February 14, 2025.

== Personal life ==
Joshua Radin attended Northwestern University, where he met and became friends with Zach Braff.

Radin also wrote the song "In Her Eyes" in celebration of his own sister's wedding.

In addition to his love of music, Radin is an avid traveler.

== Philanthropy ==
Radin has been involved with Little Kids Rock, a national nonprofit that provides music education to schools without music programs. Radin visited schools in six cities during his 2011 tour in support of The Rock and the Tide to give guitar lessons on the song "Brand New Day", and brought some of the students on stage at his concerts to perform the song with him. He did so again in 2015 for his song "Beautiful Day".

Radin also supports the North Shore Animal League as a celebrity ambassador, donating 100% of the proceeds from his single, "Here, Right Now", to the New York-based animal rescue organization.

== Television and movies ==
Radin's songs have been used on television series such as Designated Survivor, Scrubs, Grey's Anatomy, Brothers and Sisters, American Idol, Cougar Town, One Tree Hill, House, Shameless, among others. Radin also made a cameo appearance in Cougar Town's 4th-season finale. As of September 2010, he had amassed more than 75 film and television placements of his songs.

== Discography ==
=== Studio albums ===
Year	Album details	Peak position								Certifications (sales threshold)
Year	Album details	US	US Rock	US Digital	US Heat	US Indie	US Folk	IRE	UK	Certifications (sales threshold)
2006	We Were Here: Released: June 13, 2006; Label: Columbia	—	—	—	34	—	—	—	—	
2008	Simple Times: Released: September 30, 2008; Label: Mom + Pop Music	34	10	116	—	2	10	48	9	BPI: Silver
2010	The Rock and the Tide: Released: October 12, 2010; Label: Mom + Pop Music	31	9	11	—	5	3	—	59	
2012	Underwater: Released: July 31, 2012; Label: Mom + Pop Music	37	11	15	—	3	2	—	60	
2013	Wax Wings: Released: May 7, 2013; Label: Self-released	73	21	24	—	14	7	—	—	
2015	Onward and Sideways: Released: January 6, 2015; Label: Self-released	49	5	14	—	3	3	—	—	
2017	The Fall: Released: January 27, 2017; Label: Self-released	—	—	—	—	17	12	—	—	
2019	Here, Right Now: Released: October 4, 2019; Label: Nettwerk	—	—	—	—	—	—	—	—	
2021	The Ghost and the Wall: Released: July 23, 2021; Label: Nettwerk	—	—	—	—	—	—	—	—	
2025	ONE DAY HOME: Released: February 14, 2025; Label: Self-released	—	—	—	—	—	—	—	—	

=== Live albums ===
- Live from the Village (2016)

=== EPs ===
- First Between 3rd and 4th (2004)
- Live Session (iTunes Exclusive EP) (2006)
- Unclear Sky (iTunes Exclusive EP) (2008)
- Simple Times – Bonus Material (Demos) EP (2009)
- Songs Under a Streetlight EP (2010)
- The Rock and the Tide (Acoustic Session) EP (2011)
- Covers, Vol. 1 EP (2020)
- though the world will tell me so, vol. 1 (2023)
- though the world will tell me so, vol. 2 (2023)

=== Singles ===
Year	Single	Peak position							Album
Year	Single	US	US Digital	AUS	CAN	IRE	SWE	UK	Album
2008	"I'd Rather Be with You"	82	39	91	61	47	34	11	Simple Times
2010	"Brand New Day"	—	—	—	—	—	—	—	Simple Times
2015	"Belong"	—	—	—	—	—	—	—	Onward and Sideways
2016	"High and Low"	—	—	—	—	—	—	—	The Fall

Others

- 2016: "Belong" (with Måns Zelmerlöw)

=== Compilation appearances ===
- His Way, Our Way (Frank Sinatra tribute album)
