= Greg Collins (music producer) =

American record producer

- Born: Gregory Francis Collins; September 5, 1969 (age 57)

Gregory Francis Collins (born September 5, 1969) is an American mixer, record producer, composer, and recording engineer, best known for his work with U2, No Doubt, Gwen Stefani, Eels, Matchbox Twenty, and Kiss.

Collins won a Grammy Award in 2006 for his work as mix engineer on the U2 singles "City of Blinding Lights" and "Sometimes You Can't Make it On Your Own" from the album How to Dismantle an Atomic Bomb, which won Album of the Year.

In 2008 Collins co-produced the band Kiss's first album of new material in over 10 years, Sonic Boom, with Paul Stanley. The album reached the number 2 position on the Billboard album charts and was praised by critics and fans as a return to the sound and spirit of the band's 1970s heyday.

Collins is the owner and operator of The Nook recording studio in Studio City, Los Angeles.
