= Michael Mantell =

American actor

- Occupation: Actor
- Years active: 1984–present

Michael Mantell is an American actor known for his supporting roles in film, television and theatre. His film appearances include Eight Men Out (1988), Quiz Show (1994), A.I. Artificial Intelligence (2001), Secretary (2002), A Mighty Wind (2003), Thank You for Smoking (2005), Ocean's Thirteen (2007) and The Ides of March (2011).

On television, Mantell portrayed David Rayburn in the comedy-drama series State of Grace (2001–2002) and appeared in numerous series, including Law & Order, The X-Files, The West Wing, Monk, Masters of Sex and The Mentalist.

== Career ==
=== Acting training and theatre ===
Mantell studied acting with Earle Hyman, who encouraged him to audition for Uta Hagen. He later studied with Hagen and credited her as an important mentor who urged him to read more dramatic literature.

In New York, Mantell appeared in The Tenth Man at Lincoln Center Theater and in Off-Broadway productions of Awake and Sing!, Incident at Vichy and Ivanov. His regional theater work includes productions at the Intiman Theatre, Seattle Repertory Theatre, Repertory Theatre of St. Louis and American Shakespeare Festival.

In 1999, Mantell played Dennis Jensen in the Relentless Theatre Company's Los Angeles premiere of Christopher Kyle's The Monogamist. In the Los Angeles Times, Michael Phillips praised Mantell's performance but found that the production's naturalistic approach did not quite suit the play's stylized dialogue.

In an interview with Back Stage West at the time, Mantell spoke about returning to theatre after several years in film and television. He compared the longer rehearsals for stage productions with the shorter preparation time for screen roles and discussed the difficulties of being cast in character roles.

In 2014, he played Jack Jerome in the Odyssey Theatre Ensemble's production of Neil Simon's Broadway Bound, directed by Jason Alexander. Stage Raw praised his performance as the father, and the Los Angeles Times listed him in the cast.

Mantell played John in the Echo Theater Company's 2015 production of Adam Bock's A Small Fire. In its review, LA Weekly singled out the ensemble's performances.

In 2016, Mantell played Max, a Holocaust survivor retiring to Florida with his wife, in Donald Margulies's The Model Apartment at the Geffen Playhouse. Charles McNulty of the Los Angeles Times praised the naturalism of Mantell's early scenes with co-star Marilyn Fox, although he found the performance less convincing as the play progressed.

=== Film ===
Early in his film career, Mantell worked several times with director John Sayles. He played former boxer and gambler Abe Attell in Eight Men Out (1988), about the 1919 Black Sox Scandal. The American Film Institute's film catalog lists him in the role.

He worked with Sayles again in City of Hope (1991) as Larry Zimmer and Passion Fish (1992) as Dr. Kline. He also appeared in American Blue Note, Little Man Tate and The Night We Never Met in the early 1990s.

He later appeared in A.I. Artificial Intelligence (2001), A Mighty Wind (2003), Thank You for Smoking (2005), Ocean's Thirteen (2007) and The Ides of March (2011).

== Filmography ==
=== Film ===
| Year | Title | Role | Notes |
|---|---|---|---|
| 1984 | The Brother from Another Planet | Mr. Love | |
| 1987 | Matewan | Doolin | |
| 1988 | Eight Men Out | Abe Attell | |
| 1988 | The Appointments of Dennis Jennings | Businessman | Short film |
| 1991 | American Blue Note | Michael Katz | |
| 1991 | Little Man Tate | Coral Bay owner | |
| 1991 | City of Hope | Larry Zimmer | |
| 1992 | Passion Fish | Dr. Kline | |
| 1993 | The Night We Never Met | Aaron Holder | |
| 1994 | Quiz Show | Pennebaker | |
| 1995 | Dead Funny | Harold | |
| 1996 | Bed of Roses | Sam | |
| 1996 | Power 98 | Lester Correl | |
| 1999 | The Velocity of Gary | Angry buyer | |
| 1999 | Deterrence | Taylor Woods | |
| 2000 | Gun Shy | Dr. Jeff Bleckner | |
| 2000 | Lost Souls | Kleiman | |
| 2000 | Chain of Command | David Lehmann | |
| 2001 | A.I. Artificial Intelligence | Dr. Frazier | |
| 2002 | Secretary | Stewart | |
| 2003 | A Mighty Wind | Deputy Mayor | |
| 2005 | Wild Things: Diamonds in the Rough | Theo Bloom | Direct-to-video |
| 2005 | Self Medicated | Dr. Reinholtz | |
| 2005 | Thank You for Smoking | Dr. Meisenbach | |
| 2005 | The World's Fastest Indian | Glenn | |
| 2007 | Ocean's Thirteen | Dr. Stan | |
| 2008 | Bart Got a Room | — | Role not established by cited source |
| 2010 | Ca$h | Mr. Dale | |
| 2011 | The Ides of March | Senator Pullman | |
| 2014 | Learning to Drive | Wendy's father | |
| 2016 | Get a Job | Tom Wilson | |
| 2016 | Live by Night | Jack Jarvis | |
| 2017 | BobbyAnna | Richard | Short film |
| 2024 | Everything Is Fine | Mark | Short film |
| 2024 | Infestation | Neighbor | Short film |

=== Television ===
| Year | Title | Role | Notes |
|---|---|---|---|
| 1986, 1988 | Spenser: For Hire | Tommy Gross / William Wright | 2 episodes |
| 1990 | Matlock | Jimmy Newton | "The Witness" |
| 1991 | Law & Order | Edward Kay | "The Secret Sharers" |
| 1994 | NYPD Blue | Steve White | "Rockin' Robin" |
| 1994 | Law & Order | Morris Hoffman | "Volunteers" |
| 1995–1996 | Space: Above and Beyond | Howard Sewell | 4 episodes |
| 1997 | Ally McBeal | Joseph Shapiro | "Pilot" |
| 1997 | Alien Nation: The Udara Legacy | Larry | Television film |
| 1998 | Early Edition | Cedric Davidson | "The Return of Crumb" |
| 1998 | Pensacola: Wings of Gold | Assistant Secretary of Defense O'Hannion | "Not in My Back Yard" |
| 1999 | The X-Files | Dr. James Riley | "Alpha" |
| 1999 | Charmed | Neighbor Paul | "Is There a Woogy in the House?" |
| 1999 | Strange World | Dr. Boaz | "Pilot" |
| 1999–2000 | Angel | Oliver Simon | 2 episodes; one uncredited |
| 2000 | ER | Mr. Spencer | "Abby Road" |
| 2000 | Judging Amy | Charles Lassiter | "Human Touch" |
| 2000 | Law & Order | Ray Garth | "Narcosis" |
| 2001–2002 | State of Grace | David Rayburn | Recurring role |
| 2001, 2004 | The West Wing | Shelly Lukens | 2 episodes |
| 2001 | When Billie Beat Bobby | Sidney Schlenker | Television film |
| 2003 | 24 | Steve Hillenburg | "Day 2: 9:00 P.M. – 10:00 P.M." |
| 2003 | CSI: Crime Scene Investigation | Dr. Stevens | "Forever" |
| 2003 | Gilmore Girls | Fred Larson | "A Tale of Poes and Fire" |
| 2003 | Miracles | Car salesman | "The Letter" |
| 2003 | The District | Prosecutor Field | 2 episodes |
| 2004 | Crossing Jordan | Roger Shyler | "Necessary Risks" |
| 2004 | Six Feet Under | Doctor | Guest appearance |
| 2005 | Medium | Nyles | Guest appearance |
| 2005 | Bones | Larry Carlyle | "The Man on Death Row" |
| 2005 | Cold Case | Ken Westin | "Honor" |
| 2006 | The O.C. | Judge Jim Mercer | "The Safe Harbor" |
| 2006 | Shark | Norman Elby | "LAPD Blue" |
| 2006 | Without a Trace | James Corwin | Guest appearance |
| 2006 | Vanished | Dr. Symers | Guest appearance |
| 2007 | Close to Home | Jesse Abrams | "Road Rage" |
| 2007 | Raines | Marshall Breckon | "Closure" |
| 2007 | How I Met Your Mother | Ben | "Something Borrowed" |
| 2007 | K-Ville | Thomas Macy | Guest appearance |
| 2007 | Saving Grace | Boone Tate | "And You Wonder Why I Lie" |
| 2007 | CSI: NY | Dr. Gavin Moore | "Buzzkill" |
| 2008 | Boston Legal | Mayor Thomas Steinbrenner | "Patriot Acts" |
| 2008 | Nip/Tuck | Julia's doctor | "Candy Richards" |
| 2008 | Monk | Brother Andrew | "Mr. Monk and the Miracle" |
| 2010 | Pretty Little Liars | Therapist | "Reality Bites Me" |
| 2012 | Harry's Law | Tina's lawyer | Guest appearance |
| 2013 | Rules of Engagement | Dr. Bromberg | "Cupcake" |
| 2013 | Masters of Sex | Byron | "Thank You for Coming" |
| 2013 | Family Tree | Kim | "Cowboys" |
| 2014 | Shameless | Dean Wheeler | "Strangers on a Train" |
| 2014 | TThe Mentalist | Leo Drembelas | "The Golden Hammer" |
| 2015 | Aquarius | Judge Murray | "(Please Let Me Love You and) It Won't Be Wrong" |
| 2015–2017 | Kingdom | Neurologist | 3 episodes |
| 2017 | Grey's Anatomy | Tim Nolan | "Back Where You Belong" |
| 2017 | Life in Pieces | Tim Nolan | "Awkward Bra Automated Ordained" |
