= Sing (Jim Bianco album) =

Studio album by Jim Bianco
- Released: March 4, 2008
- Recorded: 2007
- Length: 36.4 minutes
- Label: Hotel Café Records, Steady Music
- Producer: Brad Gordon, Jim Bianco

Jim Bianco chronology
Painkiller (EP) (2006)	Sing (2008)	Once Again, with Feeling! (2009)

Sing is the second official studio album released by recording artist Jim Bianco and the first album to be released on the Hotel Cafe Records label. Bianco has said that most of the songs on this album were composed on the piano at the Hotel Café after regular club hours.

In 2008, "I Got A Thing For You (Remix)" was featured in the national television ad campaign for "Chickdowntown.com" and "To Hell With the Devil" was featured during an episode of Moonlight on CBS. Also in 2008, Bianco performed "I Got A Thing For You" on The Late Late Show with Craig Ferguson, which aired in October. In 2010, four songs from this album were featured in the film Ca$h. In 2012, "I Got A Thing For You" was featured in an episode of NBC's series The Firm.

== Track listing ==
All songs were written by Jim Bianco.

1. “I Got A Thing For You”–3:32
2. “Sing”–3:36
3. “Somebody’s Gonna Get Hurt”–3:41
4. “Painkiller”–3:16
5. “Never Again”–2:40
6. “If Your Mama Knew”–3:38
7. “Wrecking Ball”–3:02
8. “Belong”–3:11
9. “Get On”–3:45
10. “To Hell With The Devil”–2:34
11. “I Got A Thing For You” (Remix)–3:39

== Personnel ==
- Jim Bianco–vocals, guitar, piano on 2, 3, 4, 8, electric piano on 9 and 11
- Brad Gordon–guitar, piano, electric piano, clarinet, accordion, percussion, background vocals, organ
- Josef Zimmerman–contrabass
- Kenny Lyon–electric guitar on 1, 3, 5, and 7
- Matt DeMerritt–saxophone, electric pianco on 7
- Jason Pipkin–percussion
- Gary Jules–guest background vocals on 2 and 6
- Cary Brothers–guest background vocals on 2 and 6
- David Ralicke– trombone, background vocals

== Additional production information ==
- Produced by Brad Gordon and Jim Bianco
- Mixed by Brad Gordon
- Engineered by Brad Gordon and Sheldon Gomberg
- Mastered by Evren Goknar at Capitol Mastering
- All photography shot by Bethany Dwyer at Fonogenic Studios
- Art direction by Jim Bianco
- Art production by Tammy Bumann

== Studio information ==
This record was recorded at Magic Carpet Studios and The Carriage House.
Basic tracks to “Get On” recorded at The Schtude with Will Golden.

== Videos ==
Bianco produced and released three videos in association with songs on this album.

- I Got a Thing For You
- Painkiller: Live from my kitchen
- Sing: A Virtual Tour Through the Album
