= The Origin (band) =

American band

- (L-R): Rony Abada, Michael Andrews, Topper Rimel

Background information
- Origin: San Diego, California, U.S.
- Genres: Indie rock, alternative, power pop
- Years active: 1985-1993
- Labels: Virgin Records, Hut Records
- Past members: Michael Andrews; Topper Rimel; Rony Abada; Gary Jules; Daniel Silverman; Todd A. Davidson

The Origin was an American alternative/indie rock/power pop band formed in San Diego, California, in 1985. The classic line-up of the band consisted of Michael Andrews, Topper Rimel, Rony Abada, and Daniel Silverman. During the band's active years in the early nineties, they released two full-length albums and five singles, with two singles charting in the top 20 of the Billboard Modern Rock Tracks chart. They broke up in 1993.

== History ==
In the mid-1980s, 14-year-old bassist Topper Rimel and 15-year-old drummer Rony Abada would spend their afternoons after school surfing and jamming out original riffs in a small room beneath the Abada family's cliffside pool. From there, they had an unbeatable view of the west-facing beaches, where they could keep an eye on the incoming pacific swells.

The two were eager to build on their raw bass-and-drum sound. They needed someone to complement their vibe—someone with a guitar and a voice that could blend with their gritty energy. Topper proposed the idea to Mike Andrews, a local rockabilly ripper who was a friend of his older brother. Mike, who had already been forming and playing in bands, was now flying solo. Topper invited him to audition, hoping his jangly guitar riffs would fill out their stripped-back rhythm section and bring something fresh to their sound. The power trio started writing songs together and playing locally around San Diego. They quickly adopted the name, Origin. It was meant to describe the mathematics of rotation or the rotating of a point around the origin which references their quick rise to popularity By 1985, the band The Origin was formed among friends who surfed together in La Jolla, southern California. The early line-up featured Gary Jules (Gary Aguirre) and Michael Andrews, who had been friends since childhood, as well as Topper Rimel and Rony Abada. In 1985, the band recorded their first single with producer Matt Silver and at Western Audio in Santee. The 7" single, titled "Music To My Ears" (b/w "Staff And Glove") was released on Pop Records. During the ensuing years, the band recruited Daniel Silverman as pianist/keyboardist, and in 1989 the band were signed to a major label contract with Virgin Records.

In the fall of 1989, the band recorded what would become their debut album at Powertrax Studios in Hollywood, with producers David Kershenbaum and Paul McKenna. In April 1990, The Origin released their self-titled debut album, The Origin, on Hut Records in the UK, and Virgin Records in the U.S. Three singles were released from the debut album: "Everyone Needs Love" (UK), "Growing Old", and "Set Sails Free". The singles "Growing Old", "Set Sails Free", and album track "November Days", received airplay on U.S. college and alternative radio, with "Growing Old" charting on the Billboard Modern Rock Tracks at number 19. The band headlined their own tour in support of their debut in the fall of 1990.

In 1991, the band relocated to the Bay Area to write and record their follow up. The latter half of 1991 was spent recording their second album Bend with producer Jeffrey Wood at Brilliant Studio in San Francisco. Additional recording took place at Studio II in Culver City. After the recording of the album was finished, keyboard player Daniel Silverman quit the band and keyboardist Todd A. Davidson was hired for their next tour. In February 1992, they released their follow up and final album, Bend, on Virgin Records. The lead single from the record "Bonfires Burning" charted at number 17 on the Billboard Modern Rock Tracks. In early 1992, the band once again headlined their own tour with openers Toad The Wet Sprocket, who were releasing their "All I Want" single and promoting their soon to be huge album, Fear. In June 1992, Richard Branson sold his record label Virgin Records to EMI causing the band to be dropped from the label which led to their breakup. "Waiting" was slated to be the second single release, but promotion for the album was stalled, and only a rare promo CD was ever released due to the consolidation of Virgin/EMI.

== Post-Origin projects ==
Following the breakup of the band in 1993, lead vocalist/guitarist Michael Andrews adopted the stage name Elgin Park, and joined The Greyboy Allstars, a soul/acid jazz band collective. He is still currently (as of 2016) playing guitar and singing with them after 22 years, having appeared on all five of their albums (1994–2013). In 2000, Michael Andrews released a self-titled album as Elgin Park featuring other players: (Eric Hinajosa: guitars/John Krylow: bass/Matt Lynott: drums/Robert Walter: electric piano, organ, electronic keyboards, samples).

In 2001, Michael Andrews scored the music for the Donnie Darko soundtrack and intended to close the film with a song by U2. The song's rights were too costly, so he called up his childhood friend Gary Jules to record vocals for a cover of the Tears For Fears' track "Mad World". "Mad World" went on to become a UK Christmas number 1 single in December 2003, and revitalized Gary Jules' music career. Michael Andrews has continued his success as a composer by scoring many films and TV shows. His soundtrack work includes: Donnie Darko (2001), Me and You and Everyone We Know (2005), Walk Hard: The Dewey Cox Story (2007), Funny People (2009), Bridesmaids (2011), The Five-Year Engagement (2012), The Reluctant Fundamentalist (2012), The Heat (2013), and Tammy (2014). TV shows: Freaks and Geeks (1999), Undeclared (2001), Wonderfalls (2004), New Girl (2011), and Ben and Kate (2012).

Michael Andrews has also released two solo albums under the name Mike Andrews: Hand On String (2006) and Spilling A Rainbow (2012). He has also produced albums by: Gary Jules, Brendan Benson, Metric, Les Sans Culottes, and Inara George; as well as played on albums by: Robert Walter, DJ Greyboy, Gary Jules, Brendan Benson, Charlie Wadhams, and Inara George.

Bassist Topper Rimel started the garage rock bands Robots in Disguise and The Deeds from 1994–1998 while completing a degree in Industrial Design at the California College of the Arts. Topper toured with Brendan Benson and the Well Fed Boys sharing the headline spot with Elliot Smith's Portland based group Heatmiser. He currently works in the fashion design industry, having designed many famous designers' handbag lines. Drummer Rony Abada now resides in Brazil.

Keyboardist Daniel Silverman eventually changed his name to Daniel Cage and released his debut album, Loud On Earth, on MCA Records in 2000. He recorded an unreleased second album titled Gold Tattoo featuring the singles "Smile", "Help Me", and "Let It Go". Daniel Cage currently works doing music for indie films, TV ads, and soundtracks. (Soundtracks: Jack & Bobby, Army Wives, See This Movie, Dylan's Run. National ads for: Nike, Reebok, Pepsi, and Sony. Songs featured in: The Dead Zone, South of Nowhere.)

== Band members ==
- Michael Andrews: lead vocals, acoustic, electric, and lap steel guitars
- Topper Rimel: bass, background vocals
- Rony Abada: drums, percussion
- Daniel Silverman: piano, keyboards, organ, background vocals

== Discography ==
=== Albums ===
Title	Album details
The Origin	Release: April 12, 1990; Formats: CD, LP, CS; Label: Virgin Records, Hut Records
Bend	Release: February 11, 1992; Format: CD, CS; Label: Virgin Records

=== Singles ===
Year	Title	US Alt.	Album
1985	"Music To My Ears"	—	non-album single
1990	"Everyone Needs Love"	—	The Origin
1990	"Growing Old"	19	The Origin
1991	"Set Sails Free"	—	The Origin
1992	"Bonfires Burning"	17	Bend
1992	"Waiting"	—	Bend

=== Music videos ===
Year	Title
1990	"Growing Old"
1990	"Set Sails Free"
1992	"Bonfires Burning"
1992	"Bend"
