= Deterrence =

Deterrence may refer to:

- Deterrence theory, a theory of war, especially regarding nuclear weapons
- Deterrence (penology), a theory of justice
- Deterrence (psychology), a psychological theory
- Deterrence (film), a 1999 drama starring Kevin Pollak, depicting fictional events about nuclear brinkmanship
