= Cookie cutter (disambiguation) =

A cookie cutter is used to cut cookies into a particular shape.

The term may also refer to:

- Cookie cutter neighbourhood, see Tract housing
- Cucoloris, a device for creating patterned illumination
- Cookie Cutter, album by Jim Blanco
- Cookie Cutter, 2023 game

== See also ==
- Cookiecutter shark
- Cookie-cutter stadium
