= Handsome Devil =

Handsome Devil may refer to:

- Handsome Devil (band), a punk band from California
- Handsome Devil (album), a 2004 album by Jim Bianco
- Handsome Devil (film), a 2016 Irish film
- "Handsome Devil" (song), a song by The Smiths

== See also ==
- That Handsome Devil, a rock band from Massachusetts
