= Jim Bianco =

American singer-songwriter

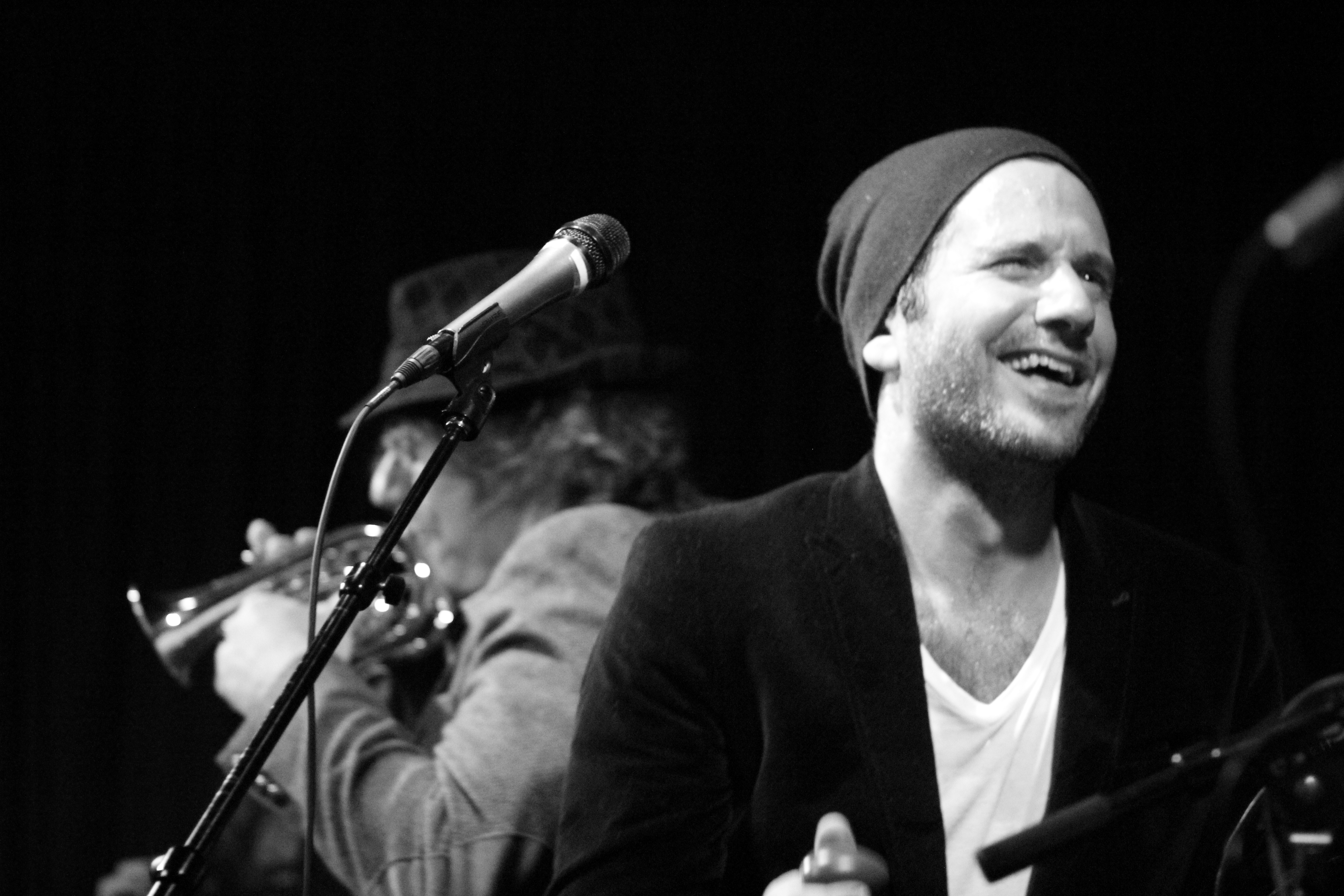
- Jim Bianco performing live at The Hotel Cafe on August 22, 2014

Background information
- Born: James Michael Bianco III; March 25, 1976 (age 50); Brooklyn, New York, US
- Genres: Rock, Americana, Singer-Songwriter
- Occupations: Singer, songwriter, musician, producer
- Instruments: Vocals, piano, guitar, bass
- Labels: Steady Records (Independent), Hotel Café Records
- Website: www.jimbianco.com

James Michael Bianco III (born March 25, 1976) is an independent musician, singer, songwriter and producer based in Lisbon, Portugal.

== Early life ==
Born in Brooklyn, New York, on March 25, 1976, Bianco is the youngest child of James Bianco, Jr. and Jane (née Levy) Bianco. The family, which also includes one older sister, moved from Brooklyn to Long Island, New York. According to his biography, in 1979 Bianco's father traded two 35 pound barbells and a bench press for the first upright piano in the Bianco home. As a youth, Bianco studied piano and played bass guitar in local bands. Bianco graduated from high school in 1994 and from college in 1998.

== Career ==
After graduation, Bianco spent time in Europe. Upon returning to the United States, a friend from college invited Bianco to Los Angeles, California, to play in his band. Bianco moved to Los Angeles in the spring of 2000. He played bass and wrote songs with the group until they disbanded. Bianco decided to learn to play the guitar, refine his singing skills and set about assembling a band of his own. He rented a room in West Los Angeles for $80 a month and practiced until he felt comfortable sharing his music. He began attending open mic nights around Los Angeles, performing at least three nights a week. One evening he attended a songwriter night at a small coffee shop in Hollywood called the Hotel Café. Soon after, Bianco was invited to open for Gary Jules.

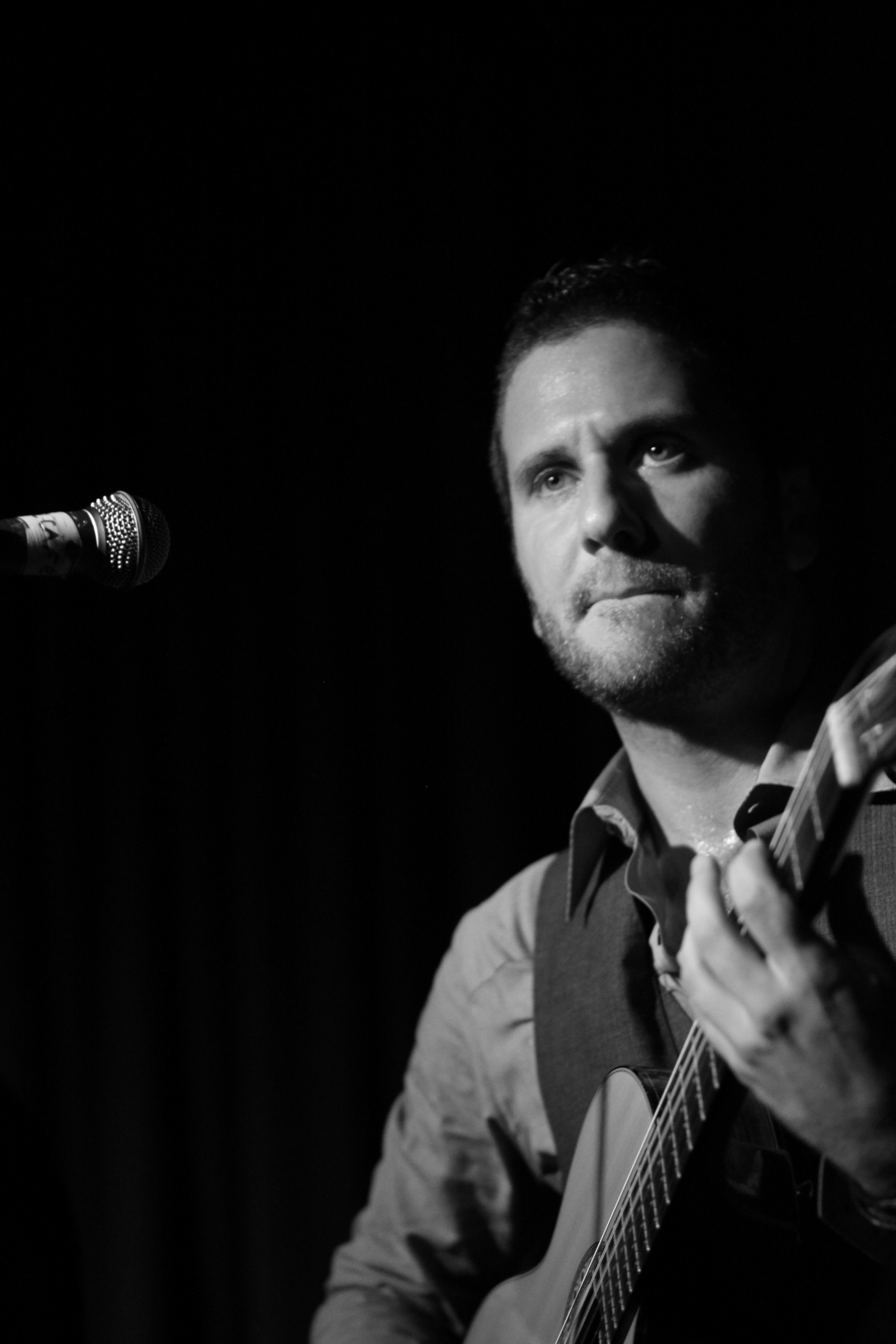
Jim Bianco performing live at the Hotel Cafe on August 28, 2009.

The Hotel Café has grown from a small coffee shop into what is now considered one of the finest venues in Los Angeles. The Hotel Café has been credited for the renaissance of the Los Angeles singer/songwriter movement that began in the early 2000s. Initiated by Gary Jules’ idea of creating a supportive space for artists to hone their craft, coupled with appropriate timing and genuine need, musicians began gravitating to the Hotel Café. In a cooperative effort, Bianco, along with fellow musicians Gary Jules, Cary Brothers and owners Marko Schafer and Max Mamikunian, worked together to transform the space, book, promote and perform shows. Their efforts received a big promotional push from legendary KCRW music director Nic Harcourt. Today, the Hotel Café is considered one of the best venues in Los Angeles, noted for the superior sound, intimate setting and quality of the acts that perform on the bill.

Bianco is a regular performer at the Hotel Café and his residencies are a popular favorite. Usually playing with his full band, Bianco's sets have a reputation for being sold-out, high energy and sexually charged events. On occasion, Bianco has rented a catwalk and invited his burlesque dancer friends to perform and throw feathers during his set. Bianco is also known for eliminating the traditional fourth wall between audience and performer by leading his band into the center of the audience during his song “Sing” encouraging audience participation, which culminates in a sing-along.

On March 4, 2008, Bianco's album “Sing” was the first album released on the Hotel Café Records label. Bianco has said that most of the songs on the album had been composed on the piano in the back room at the Hotel Café after regular club hours.

Cary Brothers is credited for initiating and producing the Hotel Cafe Tour that began in 2005. Bianco has been included in the roster of headlining performers on the tour since its inception. He is one of the few of the Hotel Café artists that has participated in both the US and European legs of the tour. Other notable artists that have participated in this event are: Jessie Baylin, Sara Bareilles, Cary Brothers, Holly Conlan, William Fitzsimmons, Greg Laswell, Imogen Heap, Gary Jules, Tom McRae, Mandy Moore, Ingrid Michaelson, Meiko, Alexi Murdoch, Jay Nash, Katy Perry, Joe Purdy, Joshua Radin, Buddy, KT Tunstall, Butch Walker, The Weepies, Dan Wilson, Brian Wright and Rachael Yamagata.

=== The Band ===
Bianco's band consists of Matt DeMerritt (aka Matty D) on saxophone, piano and flute, Brad Gordon (aka Professor Beeg) on keyboard, trumpet, clarinet and accordion, Kenny Lyon on electric guitar, Jason Pipkin (aka Pip) on drums, Josef Zimmerman (aka Joe EZ) on upright bass.

Bianco's full band was established by 2003. The first official member to join the band was drummer, Jason Pipkin. Bianco met Pipkin at a gig the day that Pipkin arrived in California from Texas. Bianco asked Kenny Lyon (then just a friend) to suggest a bass player and was introduced to Josef Zimmerman. Bianco began looking for a saxophone player and Zimmerman suggested Matt DeMerritt. After seeing Bianco's show, multi-instrumentalist Brad Gordon joined the crew offering to play keyboard, trumpet, clarinet and accordion. After seeing Bianco's show at The Mint in Los Angeles, Kenny Lyon decided to join the band.

In 2014, Bianco formed his 12 piece band Forniquette. Bianco describes their sound as "modern brothel music." The members of Forniquette are Jim Bianco (Vocals), Alex Budman (Clarinet/Tenor), Jon Flower (Bass), Jordan Katz (trumpet), Phil Krohnengold (Accordion), Elizabeth Lea (Trombone), Danny Levin (Trumpet), Chris Lovejoy (Percussion), Nick Mancini (Vibes), David Moyer (Baritone Sax), Jason Pipkin (drums), David Ralicke (Trombone).

==== Albums ====
Bianco has officially released four studio albums:

- Handsome Devil
- Sing (HCR)
- Loudmouth
- Cookie Cutter

Bianco's unofficial releases include

- Well Within Reason
- Jim Bianco and the Tim Davies Big Band
- Steady (released in Japan)
- Once Again, with FEELING! (NoiseTrade)

He has also released one studio EP of ballads titled "Painkiller", one live album titled "Jim Bianco Live at the Hotel Cafe", and one four song self-titled EP with his brothel band Forniquette.

Prior to restructuring the CDBaby Top Sellers format in July 2009, three of Bianco's albums were ranked among the top 50 best sellers in the following categories:

- Well Within Reason – Rock: Acoustic #50 and Mood: Quirky
- Handsome Devil – Rock: Acoustic #45, Rock: Rock Roots #24, Type: Lyrical #26
- Jim Bianco and the Tim Davies Big Band – Jazz: Big Band #28

=== Career highlights ===
- Bianco has been named among the top 100 hottest unsigned acts in Southern California by music trade industry journal Music Connection in 2002, 2004 and 2007.
- In 2003, Bianco entered the “Acoustic Live” music competition. Out of more than 500 applicants, Bianco placed first. The contest has been billed as an elimination style acoustic battle of the bands. Submissions are judged based on songwriting, performance, musicianship and originality.
- On September 2, 2004, Bianco and his band appeared on Nic Harcourt's esteemed Morning Becomes Eclectic radio program in support of the release of "Handsome Devil." They performed seven songs over the course of two sets and Bianco was interviewed by Nic Harcourt.
- In 2004, RCA recording artist Tunde Baiyewu, a member of Lighthouse Family, covered Bianco's song “Long Way Home.” The recording was released as a bonus track on Baiyewu's self-titled solo album, "Tunde."
- Bianco has been a regular performer in showcases at the SXSW musical festival since 2002.
- Bianco was one of eleven Los Angeles singer/songwriters invited by the Getty Museum to participate in a special Friday evening performance called "Drawing on LA: Songs for Taddeo Zuccaro". This concert was presented in conjunction with the exhibit "Taddeo and Federico Zuccaro: Artist-Brothers in Renaissance Rome." On December 14, 2007, Bianco played piano and sang his song “Thundercloud.”
- On February 22, 2008, Bianco's song “Belong” was featured as KCRW’s Top Tune.
- On September 8, 2008, Bianco and his band performed "I Got A Thing for You" on The Late Late Show with Craig Ferguson which aired on October 7, 2008.
- On November 16, 2008, Bianco performed a five-song set as a part of NPR's Mountain Stage in Charleston, West Virginia while on tour supporting Shelby Lynne.
- The Ventura Film Society invited Bianco to screen his series of short films and perform a set on March 17, 2010, at the 2010 Ventura Film Society Benefit.
- Bianco walked the red carpet at the world premiere of the film Ca$h on March 25, 2010. The film features four of Bianco's song. The event was held at Brenden Theaters at the Palms Casino Resort in Las Vegas, Nevada.
- Bianco made a guest appearance playing guitar with Aqualung during the musical guest segment of The Tonight Show with Jay Leno on April 28, 2010. They performed Aqualung's song "Reel Me In."
- Bianco was on the cover of the Ventura County Reporter on the May 6, 2010, issue. He was quoted in Butch Warner's feature article, "The Magic of Music."
- On June 2, 2010, Bianco appeared as a guest on Sue Marchant's BBC Cambridgeshire radio program. Along with being interviewed, Bianco sang his song "Sing" and Marchant played the studio version of "I've Got A Thing For You."
- In August 2010, Bianco performed at Hotel Carolina, an annual two-day singer-songwriter festival held in South Carolina.
- On August 3, 2010, Bianco collaborated with Kickstarter to launch a fan funding campaign to raise money for the release of his third official studio album, "LOUDMOUTH." Over the course of the 45-day campaign, people were asked to pledge money in exchange for gifts based on their pledge level. Bianco's gifts included autographed advance copies of the new album, T-shirts, buttons, a recording of your favorite Jim Bianco song, a limited edition memorabilia book, a personal song written based on a questionnaire with the song appearing on an album with proceeds going to charity, a house concert, a live stream performance of a set from inside his apartment, opportunities to appear as a character in the animated video for his song "Elevator Operator," and Bianco would become an ordained minister in the Universal Church to officiate a wedding. The campaign ended at 11:59 pm EDT on September 17, 2010. Bianco received $31,500.00 in pledges from 346 backers, exceeding his initial pledge goal of $15,000.00 by $16,500.00.
- On November 30, 2010, the cnn.com article "Give a Musician or Cause a Boost" featured Bianco's successful fan funding campaign with Kickstarter.
- On March 4, 2011, Bianco's song "Sinners," from his album Loudmouth, exclusively premiered worldwide in an article by Mike Ragogna of The Huffington Post.
- On March 7, 2011, the award-winning film “Sing: The Hotel Café Tour,” directed by Laura Crosta, made its television premiere on the DOC: The Documentary Channel. The film's name is taken from Bianco's song and the title track of his second studio album, Sing. The film features Bianco, Sara Bareilles, Gary Jules, Ingrid Michaelson, Greg Laswell, Josh Radin, Cary Brothers, Imogen Heap, Butch Walker, Meiko, Brad Gordon, Nic Harcourt and others, as it chronicles friendships forged through music at The Hotel Café, which inspired the renowned Hotel Cafe Tour.
- On April 4, 2011, Bianco's song “Talented” was featured as KCRW’s Top Tune.
- Bianco performed on BalconyTV Melbourne July 2011.
- CNN's sister station HLN's show "Making it in America" featured Bianco's successful Kickstarter campaign on September 25, 2012.
- Cookie Cutter was featured on NPR's All Things Considered on October 2, 2013. Host Audie Cornish interviewed Bianco about the process of creating Cookie Cutter.
- Bianco regularly lends his time and talents to charities and benefits. The following is a list of events in which he has participated: Toys for Tots, Eric Garcetti Fundraiser, Rainn Benefit (2007 & 2008), Jordan Lawhead Cancer Fund (March 2009), Obama Nights! (Oct 2008), Night with the Friends of El Faro (May 2005), Ho-Ho-Tel for LAFD Sparks of Love Toy Drive (Dec 2008 & 2009), Pop & Politics with Jimmy Dore for Hurricane Katrina Relief (2005), Doctors Without Borders (Feb 2008), Tom's Shoes (July 2009), Give Into the Groove to benefit American Red Cross (2005), Larchmont Charter School (June 2009), Ventura Film Society Festival Benefit (2010) and The Pink Project.

=== Touring ===
Bianco has shared billing with many notable acts including: Squeeze, Gary Jules, Steve Earle, Levon Helm, Shelby Lynne, Amy Macdonald, Tift Merritt, Johnette Napolitano, Concrete Blonde, Over the Rhine, Neil Finn, Josh Ritter, Joshua Radin, Bleu, Garrison Starr, Loudon Wainwright III, Amber Rubarth, The Milk Carton Kids, Jenny Owen Youngs and many more.

In 2002, Keiji Matsumoto, a Japanese independent record store owner, discovered “Well Within Reason” online and contacted Bianco about selling the album in his store Café Goattee. The album sold out quickly and with the release of “Handsome Devil” in 2004, Matsumoto booked Bianco on a tour across Japan in February 2005. Accompanied by Brad Gordon and Jason Pipkin, Bianco played all over the country. In 2006, Bianco released his album "Steady" in Japan. Bianco, again with Brad Gordon and Jason Pipkin, toured Japan in April 2006 and returned for their third tour in June 2009. In April 2010, Bianco returned to Japan for an acoustic tour, playing six shows in five cities. In March 2012, Bianco returned to Japan for a seven city tour with Gary Jules.

=== Documentaries ===
- Map the Music (2010) as himself
- Sing: The Hotel Cafe Tour Documentary (2010) as himself

=== Television appearances ===
- NRK – Nett TV Norway (May 2008)
  - Performed “Sing” with Brad Gordon
- CBS – The Late Late Show with Craig Ferguson (October 7, 2008)
  - Performed “I Got A Thing For You” with the full band
- NBC – The Tonight Show with Jay Leno (April 28, 2010)
  - Played guitar with Aqualung on the song "Reel Me In"
- HLN – Making It In America (September 25, 2012)
  - News article featuring fan funding through Kickstarter.

=== Television placements ===
- HBO – Real Sex
  - "So Far So Good"
- A&E – Random 1
  - "Untended Fires"
    - Season 1 Episode 6 – Hope for the Holidays. Aired 12.13.05
  - "Best That You Can Do"
    - Season 1 Episode 8 – Taking the Weight Off. Aired 01.06.06
  - "Sorry" & "Tennessee Wedding"
    - Season 1 Episode 9 – Tough Breaks. Aired 01.13.06
- CBS – Moonlight
  - "To Hell With the Devil"
    - Season 1 Episode 8 – "12:04AM". Aired 10.05.07
- ABC – Men In Trees
  - "Indeed In Love" – Written by Jim Bianco/Quincy Coleman, performed by Quincy Coleman
    - Season 2 Episode 12 – Read Between the Minds. Aired 03.19.08
- NBC – Life
  - "Been A Long Time" – Written by Gary Jules. Duet performed by Gary Jules and the Group Rules featuring Jim Bianco
    - Episode 215 – I Heart Mom. Aired 02.18.09
- FX – Justified
  - "I Got A Thing For You"
    - Season 1 Episode 10 – The Hammer. Aired 05.18.2010
- HBO – True Blood
  - "So Far, So Good"
    - Season 3 Episode 33 – Everything is Broken. Aired 08.15.10
- NBC – The Firm
  - "I Got A Thing For You"
    - Season 1 Episode 5 – Chapter 5. Aired 01.26.12
- ABC – The Neighbors
  - "Leaving on a Jet Plane" as Hooray Matinee
    - Season 2 Episode 22 – There Goes The Neighbors' Hood. Aired 04.11.2014
- USA Network – Royal Pains
  - "I Won't Tell You"
    - Season 6 Episode 12 – A Bigger Boat. Aired 08.26.2014

=== Advertisements ===
- Chickdowntown.com Commercial (Summer/Fall 2008)
  - "I Got A Thing For You (Remix)"
- German Car Commercial (2009)
  - Always

=== Movie placements ===
- Movie: Sherrybaby Soundtrack (2006)
  - Track #15 "Painkiller"
- Movie: Waitress Soundtrack (2007)
  - "Sorry"
- Movie: Ca$h Soundtrack (2010)
  - "I Got A Thing For You"
  - "I Got A Thing For You (Remix)"
  - "Get On"
  - "To Hell With the Devil"

=== Live concert video ===
- Live at the Hudson Theater (2013)
  - Recorded live in Los Angeles on October 1, 2013. Released on March 25, 2014.

=== Music videos ===
- Best That You Can Do (2006)
- Painkiller Live from My Kitchen (2008)
- I Got A Thing For You (2008)
- Sing-a virtual tour through the record (2008)
- Sinners (2011)
- Elevator Operator (2011)
- That's What She Said (2012)

Guest appearances

- Laura Jansen's "Wicked World" Video as The Big Bad Wolf (2009)

=== Short films ===
Films created and produced by Jim Bianco

- A Drive Through Southport, England (2006)
- On the Road with Gary Jules (2006)
- A Ride Through Japan (2007)
- The March of Shibuya (2007) available exclusively on the "Painkiller" EP
- Miranda (2007) available exclusively on the "Painkiller" EP
- Gary Jules and Jim Bianco Summer Tour (2007)
- Sixteen Days In England (2008)
- Jim Flies A Plane Over Malibu (2008)
- Pie Fight with Ingrid Michaelson and Jim Bianco (2008)
- Jessie Baylin's Pornstar Name (2008)
- El Toro Y Yo (2009)
- Kite (2009)
- Cucina Bianco (2009)
- Balloon (2009)
- Bathtub (2009)
- Makudonaldo (2010)
- Kickstarter Movie (2010)
- Gratitude (2010)
- A Jim Bianco Christmas (2010)
- The Magician (2011)

== Discography ==
=== Studio albums ===
- Handsome Devil (2004)
- Sing (2008)
- Loudmouth (April 2011)
- Cookie Cutter (October 2013)

=== Unofficial releases ===
- Well Within Reason (2002)
- Jim Bianco and the Tim Davies Big Band (2003)
- Steady (2006) (Released in Japan)
- Once Again, with FEELING! (2009)

=== Live albums ===
- Jim Bianco Live at the Hotel Cafe (2003)

=== EPs ===
- Painkiller (2006)

(includes four bonus short films by Jim Bianco)

- Forniquette (2015)

=== Compilations ===
- L.A. SONG ALLIANCE: SONGS FOR AN UNREAL CITY (2003)
  - Track #2 "Two Birds"
- LIVE AT THE HOTEL CAFÉ, VOLUME 1 (2004)
  - Track #1 "Tennessee Wedding"
- MPRESS RECORDS NEW ARRIVALS, VOLUME 1 (2006)
  - Track #4 "Goodness Gracious"
- LED SKY ACOUSTIC HITS (2007)
  - Track #9 "Best That You Can Do"
  - Track #10 "Sorry"
- PASTE MUSIC SAMPLER #41 (2008)
  - Track #13 "I Got A Thing For You"
- Robin Danar's ALTERED STATES (2008)
  - Track #11 "Life During Wartime" (Talking Heads Cover)
- FRUITCAKE-SINGER/SONGWRITERS (2008)
  - Track #3 "Sing"
- M:M MUSIC MEETING CD Volume 6, Disc 1 (2008)
  - Track #20 "Sing"
- THE HOTEL CAFÉ PRESENTS WINTER SONGS (2008)
  - Track #15 "Auld Lang Syne (Charity Medley)"

=== Collaborations ===
- C. Duck Anderson & Nate Richert – TONE CONTROL (2004)
  - Track #4 "Every Day" (piano)
- Quincy Coleman – COME CLOSER (2006)
  - Co-producer, co-writer of "Indeed In Love", "Sleep Late" and "Don't Go Away"
- Steve Reynolds – THE CARNIVAL PAPERS (2008)
  - Track #4 "Once In Your Life" (piano)
- Gary Jules – BIRD (2008)
  - Track #7 "Been A Long Time" (featured)
- Keaton Simons – CAN YOU HEAR ME (2008)
  - Track #11 "Can You Hear Me" (background vocals)
- Kenny Lyon – NATHANIEL'S PLAYHOUSE (2008)
- Brother Sal – BLOOD & DUST (2009)
  - Track #9 "Broke/Busted" (featured)
- Hooray Matinee – HOORAY MATINEE (2014) with Petra Haden
  - 5 track EP (performer and producer)
