= Once Again, with Feeling! =

Once Again, with FEELING!

Compilation album by Jim Bianco
- Released: August 25, 2009
- Recorded: 2001–2009
- Genre: Acoustic rock
- Length: 71:00 minutes
- Label: Independent
- Producer: Jim Bianco

Jim Bianco chronology
Sing (2008)	Once Again, with FEELING! (2009)	Loudmouth (2011)

Once Again, with Feeling! is a twenty song compilation by recording artist Jim Bianco. Released August 25, 2009, this compilation features eleven popular tracks from three of Bianco's studio albums and nine previously unreleased tracks from Bianco's collection of demos, alternate versions and B-sides.

This album was released exclusively through NoiseTrade.com. NoiseTrade, in conjunction with the artist, allows people to tell five friends about the album in exchange for the ability to download the entire collection for free. NoiseTrade also offers the option to "pay what you want" for the album.

== Track listing ==
All songs were written by Jim Bianco, except for "Walk on the Wild Side" by Lou Reed and "This Land is Your Land" by Woody Guthrie.

1. “Best That You Can Do”– 3:51 from Handsome Devil
2. “I Got A Thing For You”– 3:32 from Sing
3. “Sing” –3:36 from Sing
4. “Handsome Devil (Reprise)”– 4:53 from Handsome Devil
5. “Tennessee Wedding”– 4:48 from Handsome Devil
6. ”’Cucarachas”–3:39 from Well Within Reason
7. “Painkiller”– 3:16 from Sing
8. “Untended Fires”–3:22 from Handsome Devil
9. “Southpaw”–3:39 from Well Within Reason
10. “Belong”– 3:11 from Sing
11. “Long Way Home”– 3:32 from Well Within Reason
12. “This Land Is Your Land” –2:00 previously unreleased track
13. “I Love You, Too”– 3:01 previously unreleased track
14. “The Stuff”– 2:40 previously unreleased track
15. ”’Wild Side” –4:03 previously released as bonus track on Jim Bianco Live at the Hotel Cafe
16. “Talented”– 4:26 previously unreleased track
17. “Wrecking Ball"(alternate version)–3:22 previously unreleased track
18. “Play It One Last Time”–3:31 previously unreleased track
19. “Lift” –3:36 previously unreleased track
20. “Never Again"(alternate version)–3:31 previously unreleased track

== Personnel ==
For personnel information, please see the individual album pages.

- Well Within Reason
- Handsome Devil
- Sing

== Production information ==
- Album Cover Photograph by Sarah Simon
- Album Cover Art by Jim Bianco
