= Jim Bianco and the Tim Davies Big Band =

Studio album by Jim Bianco and Tim Davies
- Released: 2003
- Genre: Jazz Big Band
- Length: 30:09 minutes

Jim Bianco and Tim Davies chronology
Jim Bianco Live at the Hotel Cafe (2003)	Jim Bianco and the Tim Davies Big Band (2003)	Handsome Devil (2004)

Jim Bianco and the Tim Davies Big Band is a collaboration between Jim Bianco and Tim Davies. Tim Davies arranged and adapted Bianco's songs and conducted his 19 piece big band, while Bianco provided the vocals.

== Track listing ==
All songs, words and music were written by Jim Bianco (BMI) except
“You are the One”: words and music by Tim Davies (ASCAP/Altered 15th) and Jim Bianco (BMI)
“Crying Because” and “Taffy and Cream Caramel”: words by Jim Bianco (BMI), music by Tim Davies (ASCAP/Altered 15th)

1. “Distracted” – 4:53
2. “Handsome Devil” – 4:02
3. “You Are The One” – 2:57
4. “Apostrophe S ” – 4:16
5. “Crying Because“– 4:26
6. “Forever And A Day” – 3:11
7. “Long Way Home” – 4:18
8. “Taffy and Cream Caramel” – 3:00 (bonus track)

== Personnel ==
- Jim Bianco–vocals

The Tim Davies Big Band performs on tracks 1, 2, 4, 5, and 7

- Mike Acosta – saxophone
- Karolyn Kafer – saxophone
- Mike Nelson – saxophone
- Lee Secard – saxophone
- Jennifer Hall – saxophone
- Jon Papenbrook – trumpet, trumpet solo on "Long Way Home"
- Stan Martin – trumpet
- Frank Ponchorello – trumpet
- Steve Campos – trumpet
- Jacques Voyemant – trombone, trombone solo on "Apostrophe S"
- Kerry Loeschen – trombone
- John Baker – trombone
- Steve Ferguson – trombone
- Mark Cally – guitar
- Alan Steinberger – piano and organ
- Jonathan Ahrens – bass
- Tim Davies – drums and percussion

The Tim Davies Quartet performs on tracks 3, 5 and 8

- Jon Papenbrook – trumpet
- Mark Cally – guitar
- Steve Pandis – bass
- Tim Davies – drums and programming

Additional Musicians

- Matt DeMerriitt – tenor sax on "Taffy and Cream Caramel"
- Sal Cracchiolo – trumpet solo on "Distracted"
- Jim Bianco, Tim Davies and Vincent Mourou – glee club on "Apostrophe S"

== Additional Production Information ==
- All song arranged and conducted by Tim Davies
- Executive Producer: Nate Richert
- Recorded and mixed by Steve Kaplan
- Big Band recording assisted by Mike Sherlock
- Big Band produced by Tim Davies and Steve Kaplan
- Quartet produced by Tim Davies and Jim Bianco
- All photography by Greg Cohen shot at the Hotel Cafe
- Art layout by Jim Bianco
- Art production by Tammy Bumann

== Studio information ==
This album was recorded at Citrus Recording Arts and 745 Studios in Los Angeles.
