= Bend (The Origin album) =

Studio album by the Origin
- Released: February 11, 1992
- Recorded: 1991
- Studio: Brilliant (San Francisco, California); Studio II (Culver City, California)
- Genre: Indie rock, alternative, power pop
- Length: 57:36
- Label: Virgin
- Producer: Jeffrey Wood

The Origin chronology
The Origin (1990)	Bend (1992)

Singles from Bend
- 1. "Bonfires Burning" Released: January 1992; 2. "Waiting (promo single)" Released: Spring 1992

Bend is the second and final album by the band the Origin, released in 1992. The lead single, "Bonfires Burning", charted at number 17 on the Billboard Modern Rock Tracks chart.

== Release and reception ==
Professional ratings
Review scores
Source	Rating
AllMusic	4.5/5 stars

Bend was released on CD and cassette on February 11, 1992, with eleven tracks featuring a more mature sound with elements of psychedelia, folk, rock, and power pop. Upon release, Bend did not chart on the Billboard 200, receiving little attention during the changing era of grunge at the time. Two of the album's tracks were released as singles, with one charting on the Billboard Modern Rock Tracks. The album is currently out of print and unavailable on digital stores and streaming sites.

AllMusic gave the album an editor rating of 4.5 out of 5 stars, with Stanton Swihart describing it as "elastic, funky, vaguely spacey, rhythm heavy, soulful. The songs were significantly stronger both melodically and thematically and the playing much more dynamic than their self-titled debut. The quartet sounds less reigned in, and, as a result, they were able to let the songs find their own forms and create a considerably more organic and rootsy vibe." Swihart continues... "the most impressive songs position themselves in a long Golden State lineage, from the Neil Young echoes of "Giving It All" to the gloomy, epic folk-rock of "Candymine" and the glimmering, sun-over-the-horizon feel of "Never Again." And the title track has a subdued beauty that seems to take an orchestral grandeur from the California landscape."

== Track listing ==
All songs written by the Origin except * written by Michael Andrews. All words by Michael Andrews.

No.	Title	Writer(s)	Length
1.	"Jumping to Fall"	Michael Andrews/The Origin	3:45
2.	"Bonfires Burning"	Michael Andrews/The Origin	4:08
3.	"Candymine"	Michael Andrews/The Origin	8:00
4.	"Racing with the Moon"	Michael Andrews/The Origin	5:34
5.	"Never Again"	Michael Andrews/The Origin	4:26
6.	"Waiting"	Michael Andrews/The Origin	4:08
7.	"Yes, I Want"	Michael Andrews/The Origin	4:25
8.	"Giving It All"	Michael Andrews/The Origin	5:24
9.	"Autonomous"	Michael Andrews/The Origin	4:08
10.	"Bend*"	Michael Andrews	5:16
11.	"Trapped in a Dream Machine"	Michael Andrews/The Origin	8:26

== Personnel ==
The Origin

- Michael Andrews – lead vocals, acoustic guitars, electric guitars, lap steel guitar, harmonica
- Daniel Silverman – acoustic piano, organ, backing vocals
- Topper Rimel – bass, backing vocals
- Rony Abada – drums

Production

- Andy Factor – A&R direction
- Jeffrey Wood – producer
- Andy Taub – engineer
- Richard Kaplan – additional engineer
- Chris Kupper – additional engineer
- Jason Wolchin – additional engineer
- Chris Haley – assistant engineer
- Jordan Jannone – assistant engineer
- Mark Ettel – mixing at Ground Control Studios (Santa Monica, California)
- Ken Koroshetz – mix assistant
- Brian Gardner – mastering at Bernie Grundman Mastering (Hollywood, California)
- Jay Moxley – guitar technician
- Melanie Nissen – art direction, photography
- Inge Schaap – design
- Jeremy Farson – cover artwork

== Singles ==
Year	Title	US Alt.	Album
1992	"Bonfires Burning"	17	Bend
1992	"Waiting"	—	Bend

=== Music videos ===
Year	Title
1992	"Bonfires Burning"
1992	"Bend"
