= Greetings from the Side =

Studio album by Gary Jules
- Released: 1998
- Genre: Alternative rock
- Length: 42:14
- Label: A&M
- Producer: Michael Andrews

Gary Jules chronology
Greetings from the Side (1998)	Trading Snakeoil for Wolftickets (2001)

Greetings from the Side is the debut studio album by the American musician Gary Jules, released in 1998.

== Critical reception ==
Professional ratings
Review scores
Source	Rating
AllMusic	4.5/5 stars

In 2004, The New York Times called the album "a fine collection of confessional songs."

== Track listing ==
All tracks are written by Gary Jules.

No.	Title	Length
1.	"Greetings from the Side"	3:48
2.	"St. Christopher's Lullabye"	2:51
3.	"Barstool"	4:21
4.	"Owen Down"	3:27
5.	"Invisible"	3:42
6.	"Bluefish"	3:57
7.	"Ghosts"	4:34
8.	"Heroes and Heroin"	3:14
9.	"Jeremiah Weed"	4:04
10.	"Nothing"	3:59
11.	"Push"	4:17
Total length:		42:14
