= Loudmouth (Jim Bianco album) =

LOUDMOUTH

Studio album by Jim Bianco
- Released: April 5, 2011
- Length: 34:03
- Label: Independent
- Producer: Wilson Golden, Al Sgro and Jim Bianco

Jim Bianco chronology
Once Again, with FEELING! (2010)	LOUDMOUTH (2011)	Cookie Cutter (2013)

Loudmouth is the third official studio album by recording artist Jim Bianco. Released April 5, 2011, this album was funded by pledges made by fans through Bianco‘s collaboration with Kickstarter. Over the course of the 45-day campaign, Bianco was able to raise $31,500. Bianco’s campaign success was featured in an article by Shanna Schwarze at CNN.com. The second track of this album, "Talented," was featured by KCRW as Today's Top Tune the day preceding its release, on April 4, 2011.

== Track listing ==
All songs written by Jim Bianco

1. “Sinners“– 3:00
2. “Talented“– 3:48
3. “Elevator Operator“– 3:13
4. “But I Still Want You” –3:44
5. “OK, I Suppose“– 4:58
6. “Take You Home“– 3:13
7. “Shut Up and Kiss Me“– 3:36
8. “Slaughter“– 4:13
9. “Home“– 4:17

== Personnel ==
- Jim Bianco–lead vocals,
- Jason Pipkin–drums 1, 4 and 6
- Marco Meneghin-drums 1, 2, 3, 5, 7, 8, 9
- Joseph Karnes-bass
- Kenny Lyon-go go go’s, electric guitar 2, 3, 4, 6, 7, 9
- Brad Gordon– background vocals 4, 5, 6, piano 1, 5 and trumpet 4
- Matt DeMerritt–saxophone
- Ben Peeler-wisenborne 8, pedal steel 5
- Jordan Katz-trumpet 6
- Percy Haverson-hollow body, feedback 3, 1
- Ken Oak-cello 7
- Oliver Kraus-cello 5, 9
- Jen Kuhn-cello 2, 8
- Fil Kronengold-all Hammond organs, background vocals 6, piano 8
- Petra Haden-go go go’s, entire girl choir 7, violin 3, 5
- Holly Conlan-background vocals 2, 6, 9
- Al Sgro-percussion 1, 3, 7 church bells 2
- Brian Wright-background vocals 3
- Sinner choir: Lelia Broussard, Holly Conlan, Sterling Andrews, Fil Kronengold, Cary Brothers, Kenny Lyon, Brother Sal, Ian Ball, Wilson Golden, Al Sgro, Tim Jones, Brad Gordon and Marko Schafer.

== Additional production information ==
- Recorded by Wilson Golden and Al Sgro
- Produced by Wilson Golden, Al Sgro and Jim Bianco
- Art design by Jim Bianco

== Studio information ==
Recorded at The Chalet.
Nylon and vox for track 8 recorded in Kenny Lyon’s apartment.

== Videos ==
- Kickstarter Movie (2010)
- Gratitude on YouTube (2010)
- Sinners (2011)
- Elevator Operator on YouTube (2011)

== Jim Bianco on LOUDMOUTH ==
- ”These songs demand more of me because of their candor. They require all the tricks of my past performances – the intensity, the burlesque, the glitter; but also a resounding honesty that I’ve realized is fundamental in all worthwhile performances.”
- “There is humor on this record, but there is a darkness that comes along with it. You’ll get an occasional laugh, but it won’t be free. And there is no love song. There are songs of lust, songs of loss and songs of longing, but no love song.”
- “With the decline in funding for the arts that we’ve seen over the past few years, and the fact that music is so accessible that it’s essentially free, I’m thankful that I can put out an album and tour independently with only the support of my fans. I’m grateful for the direct relationship I have with my fan base; it allows me to continue making the music that I like for the people who want it – all without a middle-man to muck up the process.”
