= Gary Jules (album) =

Studio album by Gary Jules
- Released: August 3, 2006
- Genre: Rock
- Length: 37:22
- Label: Down Up Down Music
- Producer: Gary Jules

Gary Jules chronology
Trading Snakeoil for Wolftickets (2001)	Gary Jules (2006)

Gary Jules is the 2006 third studio album by American singer-songwriter Gary Jules.

== Track listing ==
All tracks are written by Gary Jules

No.	Title	Length
1.	"Falling Awake"	2:39
2.	"The Devil Keeps Grinning"	3:57
3.	"Gone Daddy"	3:34
4.	"Serpent-In-Claw"	1:54
5.	"Little Greenie"	4:24
6.	"There's a Hole in the Sky"	2:21
7.	"Whiskey for Everybody"	4:05
8.	"Wichita"	3:55
9.	"Andalucia"	3:54
10.	"Dustcloud and the Honeybees"	3:30
11.	"Road Song Blues"	3:09
12.	"One Little Light"	3:34
Total length:		37:22
