= Stephen Milburn Anderson =

American film director

- Born: March 13, 1948; United States
- Died: May 1, 2015 (aged 67); Denver, Colorado, U.S.
- Education: University of New Mexico
- Occupations: Film director, screenwriter
- Notable work: South Central
- Spouse: Mary Anderson

Stephen Milburn Anderson (March 13, 1948 – May 1, 2015) was an American film director and screenwriter who wrote and directed eight films. He is best known for South Central, which was produced by Oliver Stone and released by Warner Bros. in 1992 and for CASH starring Sean Bean and Chris Hemsworth, released by Lionsgate in 2010.

== Career ==
Anderson's short film Hearts of Stone (1989) was nominated for a Golden Hugo award at the Chicago International Film Festival and played at Sundance, where it came to the attention of Oliver Stone. They subsequently collaborated on South Central, which received wide critical acclaim. Janet Maslin of The New York Times named Anderson in the "Who's Who Among Hot New Filmmakers," along with Quentin Tarantino and Tim Robbins. Additionally, The New Yorker praised South Central as one of the year's best independent films.

== Personal life ==
Anderson earned a bachelor's degree in motion picture production and American literature at the University of New Mexico. He then earned a master's degree in motion picture production at the University of California, Los Angeles.

Anderson was married to his wife, Mary, for more than 30 years. He died at his home in Denver, Colorado on May 1, 2015, from throat cancer.

== Filmography ==
=== Short film ===
Year	Title	Director	Writer	Producer
1987	Ray's Male Heterosexual Dance Hall	No	No	Yes
1988	Hearts of Stone	Yes	Yes	Yes
1988	Mr. Fixit	No	No	Yes
2000	Guns on the Table	No	No	Yes

Executive producer

- ...They Haven't Seen This... (1988)
- Sapphire Man (1988)
- Homesick (1988)
- Conquering Space (1989)

=== Feature film ===
Year	Title	Director	Writer	Producer
1992	South Central	Yes	Yes	Yes
1997	Dead Men Can't Dance	Yes	No	No
2010	CASH	Yes	Yes	Yes

=== Television ===
Executive producer

- Teach 109 (1990)
- Peacemaker (1990)
- Open Window (1991)

Producer

- To the Moon, Alice (1991)

Writer

- Dog Eat Dog (2002)
