= Painkiller (Jim Bianco EP) =

EP by Jim Bianco
- Released: December 14, 2006
- Length: 11:51
- Label: Independent
- Producer: Jim Bianco

Jim Bianco chronology
Steady (2006)	Painkiller (2006)	Sing (2008)

Painkiller is a studio EP of ballads by recording artist Jim Bianco. It was released on December 14, 2006.

== Track listing ==
All songs were written by Jim Bianco.

1. “Belong”– 3:16
2. “Somebody's Gonna Get Hurt"–3:38
3. “Painkiller” –2:59
4. “Thundercloud”– 2:38

Bonus short films by Jim Bianco:

1. “The March of Shibuya"
2. "Best That You Can Do"
3. A Drive Through Southport, England
4. “Miranda"

== Music video ==
- Painkiller Live from My Kitchen (2008)
