= Trading Snakeoil for Wolftickets =

Studio album by Gary Jules
- Released: November 15, 2001
- Recorded: 2001
- Genres: Folk; blues; alternative rock
- Length: 47:56
- Label: Sanctuary
- Producers: Michael Andrews; Gary Jules

Gary Jules chronology
Greetings from the Side (1998)	Trading Snakeoil for Wolftickets (2001)	Gary Jules (2006)

Professional ratings
Aggregate scores
Source	Rating
Metacritic	71/100
Review scores
Source	Rating
AllMusic	4.5/5 stars
Mojo	3.4/5
Uncut	4/5 stars

Trading Snakeoil for Wolftickets is the second studio album by American singer-songwriter Gary Jules, released in 2001 by Sanctuary Records. Despite the year of release, it took three years to chart in both the UK and US, eventually reaching the UK Top 40 and Billboard 200 in 2004. The popular Tears for Fears cover "Mad World", which was featured on the Donnie Darko soundtrack and in the Gears of War trailer, is included on the album.

== Track listing ==
All tracks are written by Gary Jules, except where noted.

No.	Title	Writer(s)	Length
1.	"Broke Window"		2:38
2.	"No Poetry"		3:58
3.	"DTLA"		3:33
4.	"Lucky"		1:55
5.	"Something Else"		4:23
6.	"Pills"		2:20
7.	"Boat Song"		4:06
8.	"Umbilical Town"		3:55
9.	"The Princess of Hollywood Way"		3:54
10.	"Patchwork G"		3:26
11.	"Barstool"		5:02
12.	"Mad World"	Roland Orzabal	3:03
13.	"Untitled" (hidden track)		5:24
Total length:			47:56

== Personnel ==
- Gary Jules – vocals, guitars, mandolin, harmonica
- Michael Andrews – guitars, bass, vocals, piano, keyboards, melodica, drums, percussion
- Sarah Brysk – vocals
- Robert Walter – piano
- Al Sgro – vocals
- George Sluppick – drums (tracks 2 and 9)
- Matt Lynott – drums (tracks 1 and 11)

== Charts ==
Chart performance for Trading Snakeoil for Wolftickets
Chart (2004)	Peak position
UK Albums (Official Charts)	12
US Billboard 200	144
US Heatseekers Albums (Billboard)	5
