= Learning to Drive (film) =

2014 film

- Theatrical release poster
- Directed by: Isabel Coixet
- Written by: Sarah Kernochan
- Produced by: Dana Friedman; Daniel Hammond
- Starring: Patricia Clarkson; Ben Kingsley
- Cinematography: Manel Ruiz
- Edited by: Keith Reamer; Thelma Schoonmaker
- Music by: Dhani Harrison; Paul Hicks
- Production companies: Lavender Pictures; Core Pictures
- Distributed by: Broad Green Pictures
- Release dates: September 9, 2014 (TIFF); August 21, 2015 (United States)
- Running time: 90 minutes
- Country: United States
- Language: English
- Box office: $3.4 million (USA)

Learning to Drive is a 2014 American comedy drama film. Directed by Isabel Coixet and written by Sarah Kernochan based on The New Yorker article Learning to Drive at Fifty-Two by Katha Pollitt, the film stars Patricia Clarkson as Wendy, a successful book critic taking driving lessons with instructor Darwan (Ben Kingsley) after the breakup of her marriage to Ted (Jake Weber) forces her to become more self-sufficient. This is the second collaboration (after Elegy in 2008) between Ben Kingsley, Patricia Clarkson, and Isabel Coixet.

The film was named first-runner up for the People's Choice Award at the 2014 Toronto International Film Festival. The film was released on August 21, 2015.

== Plot summary ==
Wendy is a known book critic, who has just broken up with her husband, Ted, during an argument in a bar. Her husband leaves the scene and calls a taxi that is driven by Darwan, who is an Indian Sikh. When Wendy suddenly jumps in the car, Darwan experiences their anger and heated exchange. The husband has enough of the accusations and sends Wendy home alone in the taxi, so Darwan also witnesses her sadness and regret.

Wendy has never needed to drive in New York, but now she needs to learn, in order to visit her daughter Tasha who is living and working on a commune farm in Vermont. Through a series of events, Wendy becomes Darwan's driving student, developing a close friendship in the process, as he is an intellectual and was a teacher back in India.

Wendy fails her license driving test on her first attempt and decides to stop trying. Tasha tells her that she has decided not to return to the farm and wants to live with her mother instead, even though it is a requirement for her college education. She also admits that she is in love with a student who was at the farm with her, and that he was going back to the college campus. Wendy tells her daughter that she must finish her farming experience and that she will figure out a way to visit her daughter.

Darwan goes through an arranged marriage to Jasleen, but the marriage is not going well, as they don’t seem to have any common interests. Darwan confides in Wendy that his marriage is having problems and Wendy asks him if he would ever cheat on Jasleen if she disappointed him. He replies with a definitive no and she tells him: “you are a good man.”

Wendy passes her next license driving test and Darwan helps her buy a new car. As they are saying their goodbyes, Darwan asks Wendy if they can meet in the future, but Wendy declines, telling him: "the trouble is, you’re a good man."

Later that night, Jasleen comes home from shopping to find Darwan sitting on their bed. She sits next to him having no idea what to expect, when he asks: "Jasleen, maybe I will not work at night anymore. Would you like that?" She smiles with a sense of relief and he puts his hand on her face and his head on her shoulder, the pair both looking happy for the first time since their wedding day.

The last scene shows Wendy driving out of New York in her new car, traveling alone to visit her daughter.

== Cast ==
- Patricia Clarkson as Wendy Shields
- Ben Kingsley as Darwan Singh Tur
- Grace Gummer as Tasha
- Jake Weber as Ted
- Sarita Choudhury as Jasleen
- John Hodgman as Car Salesman
- Samantha Bee as Debbie
- Matt Salinger as Peter
- Daniela Lavender as Mata
- Michael Mantell as Wendy's Father
- Avi Nash as Preet
- Bryan Burton as Student Driver
- Nora Hummel as Driving Examiner

== Reception ==
On Rotten Tomatoes, the film has an approval rating of 67% based on reviews from 102 critics, with an average 6.1/10. The site's consensus states: "The story's a bit predictable, but Learning to Drive is elevated by typically strong work from stars Patricia Clarkson and Ben Kingsley." On Metacritic, the film has a score of 59 out of 100, based on reviews from 24 critics, indicating "mixed or average" reviews.

The Guardian calls it "a modest drama with a big heart", and says

...at 89 minutes, [it] is exactly as succinct as it needs to be, and [is] not long enough to wear out its welcome. It’s a modest drama with relatively few surprises, but that’s not to say it is predictable or rote, as it lives or dies on the excellence of its leads – and Ben Kingsley and Patricia Clarkson are rarely anything but brilliant.
