= Robert Primes =

American cinematograher

- Born: Robert Joseph Primes; January 10, 1940 (age 85); San Francisco, California, U.S.
- Occupation: Cinematographer
- Years active: 1973–present

Robert Joseph Primes (born January 10, 1940) is an American cinematographer. He was cinematographer for the 1997 film Money Talks alongside Russell Carpenter. Primes's other cinematography credits includes, Baadasssss!, Las Vegas, Aspen Extreme, Night Stalker, The Hard Way, Thirtysomething, Felicity, Bird on a Wire, Cash, They Call Me Bruce? and Quantum Leap.

Primes has been nominated four times for Primetime Emmy Awards for Outstanding Cinematography, winning in 1995 for My Antonia and in 1999 for Felicity.
