= Cash (2010 film) =

- Promotional film poster
- Directed by: Stephen Milburn Anderson
- Written by: Stephen Milburn Anderson
- Produced by: Naveen Chathappuram; Stephen Milburn Anderson; Prema Thekkek
- Starring: Sean Bean; Chris Hemsworth; Victoria Profeta; Mike Starr; Michael Mantell; Glenn Plummer; Antony Thekkek
- Cinematography: John R. Leonetti; Robert Primes
- Edited by: Mark Conte
- Music by: Jesse Voccia
- Distributed by: Roadside Attractions
- Release dates: March 1, 2010 (United Kingdom); March 26, 2010 (United States)
- Running time: 108 minutes
- Country: United States
- Language: English

Cash (stylized as Ca$h) is a 2010 American independent crime-thriller film directed by Stephen Milburn Anderson that stars Sean Bean and Chris Hemsworth. The film released direct-to-DVD in the United Kingdom on March 1, 2010, before it released in theatres in the United States on March 26, 2010.

== Plot ==
When a suitcase is thrown out of a car that is involved in a car chase and lands on the car of Sam Phelan (Chris Hemsworth), he initially curses his luck. But then he finds the suitcase is loaded with money. After bringing the suitcase to his home, he convinces his wife Leslie (Victoria Profeta) that they should use the money.

Meanwhile Pyke Kubic (Sean Bean) visits his twin brother Reese (also Bean) in jail, who tells him that he threw a suitcase with about half a million dollars from his car when he was being chased by the police. Pyke decides to go and find the money.

After Pyke finds the Phelans, he asks for the money back. They return whatever money they have left after they bought a new car, furniture and other minor expenses. Pyke forces the Phelans to rob stores, in order to get him the amount of money the Phelans spent, which they do, reluctantly at first but later with more of a taste for it. After robbing over ten stores in the course of a few days, they are still short on the money, and Sam proposes to rob a bank. There he changes the gun without bullets which Pyke gave him with that of the guards, and Leslie fatally shoots Pyke in a struggle. Pyke's car and his corpse are sent to a junkyard, where a worker is bribed into destroying the car and the body.

The Phelans again keep the money, but return all they stole, adding damages for people who were hurt in the course of the robberies. Unbeknownst to them, Reese, who originally threw the cash out of his car, has been released from prison.

== Cast ==
- Antony Thekkek as Bahadurjit Tejeenderpeet Singh
- Chris Hemsworth as Sam Phelan
- Victoria Profeta as Leslie Phelan
- Mike Starr as Melvin Goldberg
- Glenn Plummer as Glen the Plumber
- Michael Mantell as Mr. Dale
- Sean Bean as Pyke Kubic / Reese Kubic
- Tim Kazurinsky as Chunky Chicken Salesman
- Robert C. Goodwin as Bartender

== Soundtrack ==
The film features music written and recorded by musician Jim Bianco from his album Sing. The film opens with "I've Got a Thing for You" and closes with "To Hell With the Devil." During the film, "Get On" and the remix of "I've Got a Thing for You" are used.
