= Michael Andrews (musician) =

American multi-instrumentalist, producer, and film score composer (born 1967)

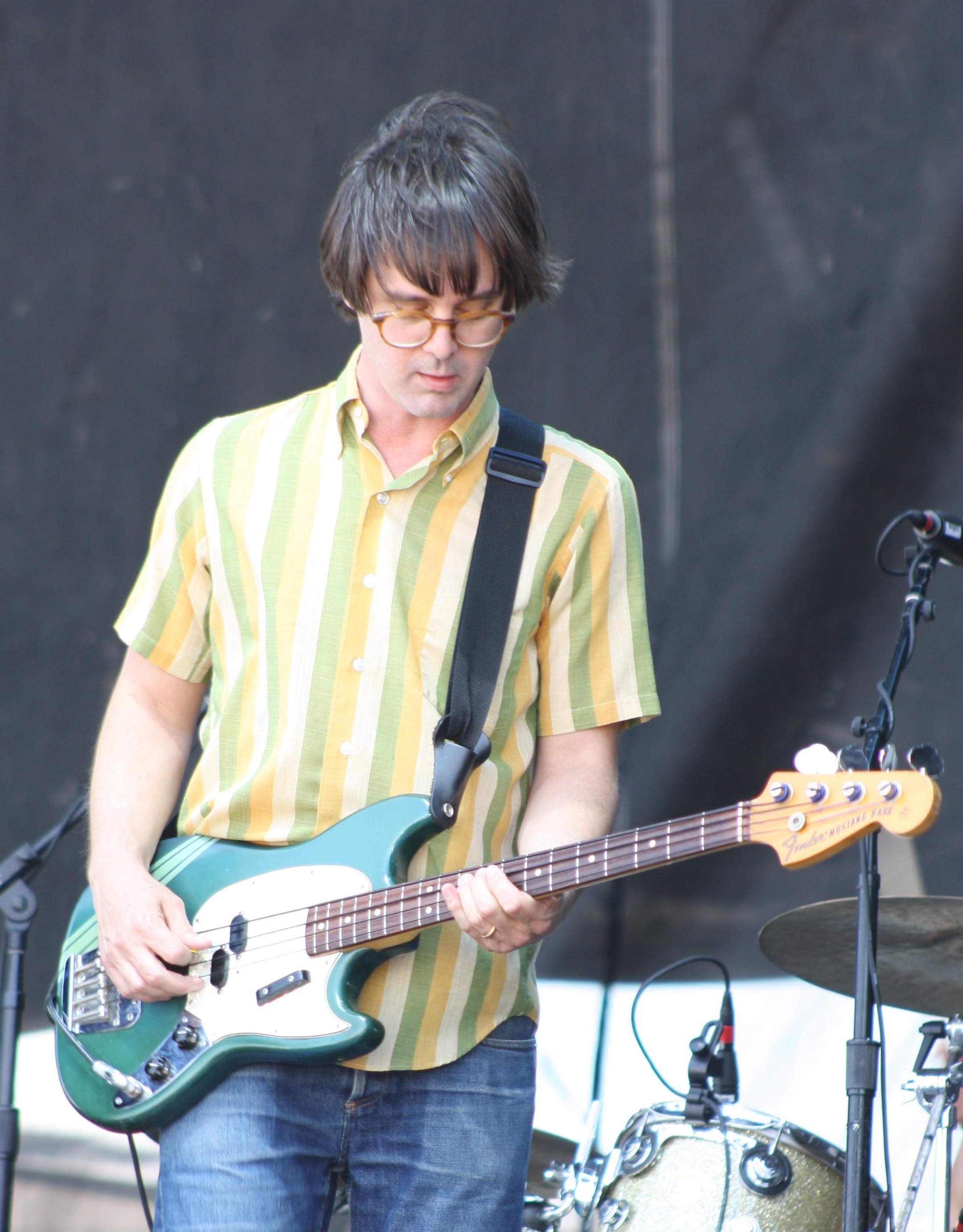
- Andrews in 2012

Background information
- Also known as: Elgin Park
- Born: Michael Peter Andrews; November 17, 1967 (age 58)
- Origin: San Diego, California, U.S.
- Genres: Film score; experimental; folk
- Occupations: Musician; composer
- Instruments: Guitar; piano; keyboards; bass guitar; marimba; drums
- Years active: 1985–present
- Labels: Avace; Ever Loving

Michael Peter Andrews (born November 17, 1967), also known as Elgin Park, is an American multi-instrumental musician, producer, and film score composer. He is best known for a cover version of the Tears for Fears song "Mad World", which he recorded with Gary Jules for the Donnie Darko soundtrack, and which became the 2003 UK Christmas number one. He is a founding member of the San Diego soul-jazz band The Greyboy Allstars, where he goes by the moniker Elgin Park.

== Soundtrack composing and production ==
After joining The Greyboy Allstars following the dissolution of his band The Origin, Andrews fell into film score composition by chance in 1998 when The Greyboy Allstars were asked to score Jake Kasdan's first feature Zero Effect and worked on the music for the highly regarded (though short-lived) TV series, Freaks and Geeks. In 2000, Richard Kelly commissioned him to do the soundtrack for the film Donnie Darko. Its original score album went on to sell over 100,000 copies (in part because of Andrews's remake of Tears for Fears' "Mad World", featuring Gary Jules), and Andrews became a composer to watch. He has since gone on to compose scores for the movies Out Cold, Nothing, Cypher, Orange County, My Suicidal Sweetheart, Me and You and Everyone We Know, The TV Set, a segment of Paris, je t'aime, Unaccompanied Minors, Bridesmaids, Walk Hard: The Dewey Cox Story and Daddy's Home, among others.

=== Donnie Darko ===
In early 2000, Jim Juvonen gave Andrews a copy of the script for the as-yet-unmade feature film Donnie Darko. Director Richard Kelly knew Andrews worked with The Greyboy Allstars, and made music under the name Elgin Park.

Like his role models John Barry and Ennio Morricone, Andrews wanted a song on his otherwise instrumental score. He chose "Mad World" by Tears for Fears (originally released in 1982), which his childhood friend Gary Jules sang as Andrews played piano.

The first soundtrack record was released by Andy Factor, a friend of Andrews, through his Everloving Records label in 2002. As Donnie Darko was not a hit at first, there was little interest in the soundtrack in the US. The film was more popular in Europe, especially in the UK, where it outgrossed the US release.

This sparked interest in the soundtrack and "Mad World", which was a 2003 Christmas #1 on the UK Singles Chart. It reached the top 30 of the American Billboard Modern Rock chart in 2004 and hit No. 1 on the Canadian Digital Singles chart in January 2007. It charted in countries like Ireland, Denmark, the Netherlands, and Australia in 2003 and 2004, and a snippet was used in the television commercial for the 2006 Xbox 360 video game Gears of War.

=== Me and You and Everyone We Know ===
In 2005, Andrews scored Me and You and Everyone We Know, a film by Miranda July praised at both Sundance and Cannes film festivals. The score to the film was released on Everloving Records on July 12, 2005.

Initially taking cues from the characters' dialogue, Andrews began writing the score. He came to understand the film's world as a kind of alternate reality where people believe in fate and chance—and this was the world he needed to paint with his music. He also saw the feelings July was trying to get across in her film as very primary. "She tries to break things down to very basic, simple shapes—the simplest shapes possible, and that totally influenced me in my music".

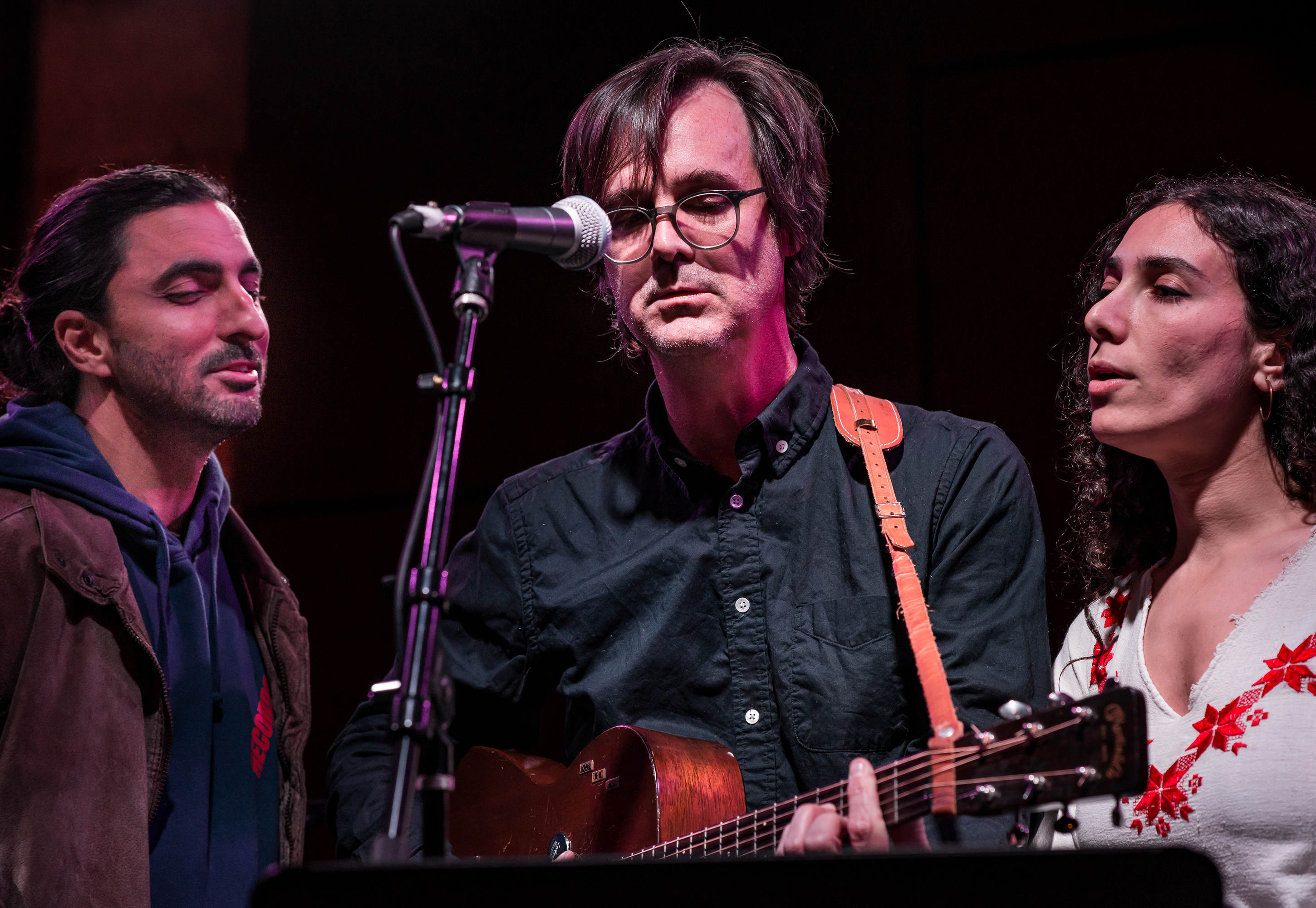
Andrews at the Unsung Heroes tribute to Eleni Mandell, January 2017.

Working out of his custom-built backyard studio in Glendale, California, Andrews spent three months creating the score using an orchestra of obscure vintage synthesizers (a miniature hotwired Casio keyboard was unearthed at a garage sale for $10) and drum machines. His concept was to play what he termed amateurish, emotional, naïve, magical and simple music on highly unemotional, inorganic instruments—for example, a calculator with built-in twelve-note keyboard that lends a haunting portamento melody to one of the film's motifs.

Other instruments used in the score include Andrews's modified piano (rather than hitting the strings directly, the hammers first make contact with a piece of soft felt, creating a warmer, slightly muffled tone), as well as his Moog and Vocoder synthesizers. Despite all the electronic gear, no MIDI was used in the recording, so that all the humanness, all the subtle variations of rhythm, are intact. Inara George adds vocals in several climactic moments throughout the film. In some cases, cues were composed of only two or three tracks in order to attain the magical simplicity for which the film called out.

== Solo career ==
Andrews released his first solo album, Hand on String, on his own newly established label, Elgin Park Recordings, in summer 2006. He is credited on the album as Mike Andrews.

In August 2012, Andrews's second solo record, "Spilling A Rainbow", was released on Everloving Records performed mostly alone, and with Dan Long and Steve Kaye recording.

== Discography ==
=== Albums ===
- Elgin Park (2000)
- Hand on String (2006)
- Spilling a Rainbow (2012)

=== Singles ===
Year	Single	Peak positions								
Year	Single	AUS	AUT	BEL (Fl)	DEN	FRA	GER	NED	SWE	SWI
2001	"Mad World" (featuring Gary Jules)	28	13	23	2	30	3	4	10	23

=== Productions/appearances ===
- The Origin – The Origin (1990)
- The Origin – Bend (1992)
- 'The Greyboy Allstars – West Coast Boogaloo (1993)
- Robert Walter – Spirit of '70 (player) (1994)
- Brendan Benson – One Mississippi (bass, guitars, background vocals) (1994)
- DJ Greyboy – Land of the Lost (guitar) (1996)
- Gary Jules – Greetings From The Side (producer) (1998)
- Elgin Park - Elgin Park (2000)
- DJ Greyboy – Mastered The Art (guitar) (2000)
- The Greyboy Allstars – Greyboy Allstars Live (2001)
- Gary Jules – Trading Snakeoil For Wolftickets (piano, producer) (2001)
- Michael Andrews – Donnie Darko: Music from the Original Motion Picture Score (songwriter, performer) (2002)
- Brendan Benson – Metarie EP (producer) (2003)
- Metric – Old World Underground, Where Are You Now? (producer) (2004)
- Les Sans Culottes – Fixation Orale (producer) (2004)
- DJ Greyboy – Soul Mosaic (guitar) (2004)
- Inara George – All Rise (producer) (2005)
- Michael Andrews – Me and You and Everyone We Know (Original Motion Picture Score) (composer, performer) (2005)
- Michael Andrews – Hand on String (2005)
- Charlie Wadhams – Free Up Your Schedule (producer/player) (2007)
- The Greyboy Allstars – What Happened to Television (2007)
- Inara George & Van Dyke Parks – An Invitation (producer) (2008)
- Inara George – Accidental Experimental (producer/cowriter) (2009)
- Michael Andrews – Spilling a Rainbow (2012)
- The Greyboy Allstars – Inland Emperor (2013)
- Robert Walter – Get Thy Bearings (producer/player) (2013)
- Inara George – Dearest Everybody (producer) (2019)
- The Greyboy Allstars – Como De Allstars (2020)
- Brooks Nielsen – One Match Left (producer/player/songwriter) (2022)
- Brooks Nielsen – The Circle EP (producer/player/songwriter) (2023)
- Fitz and the Tantrums – Perfect Holiday (producer/songwriter) (2023)
- Fitz (of Fitz and the Tantrums) Summer Of Us (producer/songwriter)(2024)
- The Greyboy Allstars – Grab Bag 2007–2023 (2024)

== Filmography ==
Year	Title	Director(s)	Studio(s)
1999	Chapter Zero	Aaron Mendelsohn	Arama Entertainment
2001	Donnie Darko	Richard Kelly	Newmarket Films
2001	Out Cold	The Malloys	Touchstone Pictures
2002	Orange County	Jake Kasdan	Paramount Pictures
2002	Cypher	Vincenzo Natali	Pandora Cinema
2003	Nothing	Vincenzo Natali	Alliance Atlantis
2005	Me and You and Everyone We Know	Miranda July	IFC Films
2006	The TV Set	Jake Kasdan	ThinkFilm
2006	Paris, je t'aime: La Vampire	Vincenzo Natali	First Look International
2006	Unaccompanied Minors	Paul Feig	Warner Bros.
2007	Walk Hard: The Dewey Cox Story	Jake Kasdan	Columbia Pictures
2009	Funny People	Judd Apatow	Universal Pictures
2010	Cyrus	Jay Duplass; Mark Duplass	Fox Searchlight Pictures
2010	She's Out of My League	Jim Field Smith	DreamWorks Pictures
2011	Bridesmaids	Paul Feig	Universal Pictures
2011	Bad Teacher	Jake Kasdan	Columbia Pictures
2011	Jeff, Who Lives at Home	Jay Duplass; Mark Duplass	Paramount Vantage
2012	The Five-Year Engagement	Nicholas Stoller	Universal Pictures
2012	The Reluctant Fundamentalist	Mira Nair	IFC Films
2013	The Heat	Paul Feig	20th Century Fox
2014	Neighbors	Nicholas Stoller	Universal Pictures
2014	Tammy	Ben Falcone	Warner Bros. New Line Cinema
2014	Sex Tape	Jake Kasdan	Columbia Pictures
2015	The Adderall Diaries	Pamela Romanowsky	A24
2015	Daddy's Home	Sean Anders	Paramount Pictures; Red Granite Pictures; Gary Sanchez Productions
2016	Dirty Grandpa	Dan Mazer	Lionsgate
2016	Neighbors 2: Sorority Rising	Nicholas Stoller	Universal Pictures
2017	Daddy's Home 2	Sean Anders	Paramount Pictures; Gary Sanchez Productions
2017	The Big Sick	Michael Showalter	FilmNation Entertainment; Apatow Productions; Amazon Studios
2018	I Feel Pretty	Abby Kohn; Marc Silverstein	Voltage Pictures; Wonderland Sound and Vision; STXfilms
2018	Instant Family	Sean Anders	Paramount Pictures; Closest To Hole Productions
2018	Second Act	Peter Segal	STXfilms; Huayi Brothers Pictures
2019	Against the Clock	Mark Polish	Benaroya Pictures; Gravitas Ventures
2019	Always Be My Maybe	Nahnatchka Khan	Netflix
2020	The Lovebirds	Michael Showalter	Quinn's House; 3 Arts Entertainment; Media Rights Capital; Paramount Pictures; Netflix
2020	The King of Staten Island	Judd Apatow	Apatow Productions; Perfect World Pictures; Universal Pictures
2021	Yes Day	Miguel Arteta	Netflix
2021	Roadrunner: A Film About Anthony Bourdain	Morgan Neville	Focus Features
2022	The Bubble	Judd Apatow	Apatow Productions; Netflix
2023	You Hurt My Feelings	Nicole Holofcener	Likely Story; FilmNation Entertainment; A24
2023	Totally Killer	Nahnatchka Khan	Blumhouse Television; Divide/Conquer; Amazon Studios
2024	Piece By Piece	Morgan Neville	The Lego Group; Tremolo Productions; I Am Other; Focus Features
2025	You're Cordially Invited	Nicholas Stoller	Amazon MGM Studios; Gloria Sanchez Productions; Hello Sunshine; Stoller Global Solutions
2026	Office Romance	Ol Parker	Netflix Studios; Nuyorican Productions RPC; For the Table; Hey Buddy

== Television scores ==
- Freaks and Geeks (1999–2000)
- Undeclared (2001–2002)
- Wonderfalls (2004)
- Desire – Ford Mondeo (2007) – TV advertisement
- New Girl (2011) – Main Title Theme
- Ben and Kate (2012) – Main Title Theme
- Togetherness (Seasons 1 and 2 – 2016 HBO)
- The Zen Diaries of Garry Shandling (2017 HBO)
- Friends from College (2019 Netflix)
- City of Ghosts (2021 Netflix)
- El Deafo (2022 Apple TV+)
- Laid (2024 Peacock)
- Platonic (2023 and 2024 Apple TV+)
