= South Central (film) =

1992 film directed by Stephen Milburn Anderson

- Theatrical release poster
- Directed by: Stephen Milburn Anderson
- Screenplay by: Stephen Milburn Anderson
- Based on: The Original South Central L.A. Crips by Donald Bakeer
- Produced by: William B. Steakley; Oliver Stone; Janet Yang
- Starring: Glenn Plummer; Carl Lumbly
- Cinematography: Charlie Lieberman
- Edited by: Steven Nevius; Michael Bloecher
- Music by: Tim Truman
- Distributed by: Warner Bros.
- Release date: September 18, 1992
- Running time: 99 minutes
- Country: United States
- Language: English
- Budget: $4 million
- Box office: $1,373,196

South Central is a 1992 American crime-drama film, written and directed by Stephen Milburn Anderson. This film is an adaptation of the 1987 fiction novel, The Original South Central L.A. Crips by Donald Bakeer, a former high school teacher in South Central Los Angeles. The film stars Glenn Plummer, Byron Minns and Christian Coleman. South Central was produced by Oliver Stone and released by Warner Bros.

The movie received wide critical acclaim, with many praising Plummer's performance, and New Yorker Magazine praising it as one of the year's best independent films. Janet Maslin of The New York Times named Anderson in the "Who's Who Among Hot New Filmmakers" in 1992, along with Quentin Tarantino and Tim Robbins.

== Plot ==
Upon his parole from the California Youth Authority in 1982, Hoover Street Deuces gang member Bobby Johnson meets with girlfriend Carole, son Jimmie, and fellow "Deuces" Ray Ray, Loco, and Bear. The gang attends a party thrown by a heroin dealer named Genie Lamp, who forces Bobby to snort a line of heroin. Bobby and Jimmie return home in the morning to find Carole passed out on the couch from smoking PCP. The Deuces return to Genie Lamp's club for retaliation where they shoot Genie's bodyguard and Bobby shoots and kills Genie. Bobby returns home and tells Carole that they have to move immediately. Soon after, the gang is caught and Bobby gets a ten-year prison sentence for the murder.

Ten years later, Bobby's son Jimmie has followed his father into the gang life. He begins stealing car stereos and selling them to Ray Ray for $20 each. Jimmie is shot in the back by a man named Willie Manchester while attempting to steal Willie's car radio. After recuperating in the hospital, he goes to a juvenile halfway house.

In prison, Bobby becomes a respected gang leader, falls from grace, and turns his life around with the help of his cellmate, Ali, a Muslim serving a life sentence for killing the men responsible for his son's murder. Once released, he returns to South Central Los Angeles and drives to the halfway house to find Jimmie. Jimmie is shocked that his father has denounced the Deuce gang and will not seek revenge against Willie Manchester, and as a result disowns him.

Jimmie goes AWOL from the halfway house and hides out with Ray Ray. Bobby goes to Ray Ray's warehouse and the two have a talk. Ray Ray opens up a door that reveals a kidnapped Willie Manchester. Ray Ray gives Jimmie a gun and tries to talk him into shooting Willie. Willie begs for his life and tells Jimmie that he did not mean to shoot him. Bobby takes Bear's gun and threatens to kill Ray Ray, but puts the gun down when he sees the look on Jimmie's face. Bobby talks to Jimmie about the mistake it would be if Jimmie killed Willie Manchester. Bobby states that Jimmie can replace goods that he steals from a man, but he cannot replace a man's life that he took. Jimmie lets go of the gun he had been holding.

Ray Ray lets go of Jimmie, Bobby, and Willie Manchester. Bobby tells Jimmie that they must start their lives over, but this time they will do it the right way. The scene fades to black as the two walk out of the warehouse together.

== Cast ==
- Glenn Plummer as Bobby "Badass" Johnson
- Christian Coleman as Jimmie "J-Rock" Johnson
- Byron Keith Minns as Ray "Ray-Ray" DeWitt
- Carl Lumbly as Ali
- Lexie Bigham as "Bear" (credited as Lexi D. Bigham)
- Vincent Craig Dupree as "Loco"
- LaRita Shelby as Carole
- Ivory Ocean as Willie Manchester
- Vickilyn Reynolds as Mrs. Manchester, Willie's Wife
- Tim DeZarn as "Buddha"
- Starletta DuPois as Nurse Shelly

== Soundtrack ==
A soundtrack containing hip hop, soul and R&B music was released on September 18, 1992, by Hollywood Records.

== Reception ==
On the review aggregator website Rotten Tomatoes, 78% of 9 critics' reviews are positive. On Metacritic, the film has a score of 64 out of 100, based on 16 critics, indicating "generally favorable reviews". Owen Gleiberman of Entertainment Weekly wrote the film “offers a wrenching view of modern youth-gang violence by demonstrating, with desperate candor, that the civilized alternatives are fast disappearing”.

== See also ==
- List of hood films
