= The Origin (album) =

Studio album by the Origin
- Released: 1990
- Recorded: 1989–1990
- Studio: Powertrax (Hollywood, California); Scream (Studio City, California)
- Genre: Pop, alternative
- Length: 40:17
- Label: Virgin; Hut (UK)
- Producer: David Kershenbaum, Paul McKenna

The Origin chronology
The Origin (1990)	Bend (1992)

Singles from The Origin
- 1. "Everyone Needs Love (UK only)" Released: 1990; 2. "Growing Old" Released: 1990; 3. "Set Sails Free" Released: 1991

The Origin is the debut album by the band the Origin, released in 1990. The single, "Growing Old", peaked at number 19 on the Billboard Modern Rock Tracks chart.

== Release and reception ==
Professional ratings
Review scores
Source	Rating
AllMusic	2.5/5 stars

The Origin was released on LP, CD and cassette in 1990 with 10 tracks featuring melodic pop and alternative rock. Upon release, The Origin did not chart on the Billboard 200, but the singles were well received and played regularly on college and alternative radio at the time. Three of the album's tracks were released as singles, with one charting on the Billboard Modern Rock Tracks.

AllMusic gave the album an editor rating of 2.5 out of 5 stars, with Stanton Swihart stating, "For a debut, The Origin is certainly solid. Many of the songs are vigorous and rosy, and the band knew its way around a groove, particularly sprightly piano-led ones -- 'Growing Old', 'Everyone Needs Love'—that show a passing familiarity with Elton John but are much jauntier... Promising in the way of chops, the Origin nevertheless still had some growing to do before their next album."

== Track listing ==
All songs written by the Origin.

No.	Title	Writer(s)	Length
1.	"Growing Old"	Michael Andrews/The Origin	3:30
2.	"November Days"	Michael Andrews/The Origin	3:18
3.	"Everyone Needs Love"	Michael Andrews/The Origin	3:22
4.	"Never Coming Down"	Michael Andrews/The Origin	5:43
5.	"Lonely Place Alone"	Michael Andrews/The Origin	4:07
6.	"Set Sails Free"	Michael Andrews/The Origin	4:26
7.	"Ride"	Michael Andrews/The Origin	4:02
8.	"Who Would've Known"	Michael Andrews/The Origin	3:21
9.	"Troubles on the Inside"	Michael Andrews/The Origin	3:16
10.	"Pull the Weight*"	Michael Andrews	5:15

note: *"Pull the Weight" segues into "One of These Days", which is available as a stand-alone song found on the "Everyone Needs Love" 12" single.

== Personnel ==
The Origin

- Michael Andrews – lead vocals, guitars
- Daniel Silverman – acoustic piano, keyboards, backing vocals
- Topper Rimel – bass guitar, backing vocals
- Rony Abada – drums

Additional musicians

- Brian Kilgore – percussion

Production

- David Kershenbaum – producer
- Paul McKenna – engineer, mixing (2-10)
- Kevin W. Smith – mixing (1)
- Craig Doubet – second engineer
- Martin Lester – second engineer
- Ross Hogarth – additional engineer
- John X. Volatis – additional engineer
- Bob Ludwig – mastering at Masterdisk (New York, NY)
- Melanie Nissen – art direction
- Steve Gerdes – design
- Annalisa – cover photography

=== Singles ===
Year	Title	US Alt.	Album
1990	"Everyone Needs Love"	—	The Origin
1990	"Growing Old"	19	The Origin
1991	"Set Sails Free"	—	The Origin

=== Music videos ===
Year	Title
1990	"Growing Old"
1991	"Set Sails Free"
