= Cookie Cutter (album) =

Studio album by Jim Bianco
- Released: October 1, 2013
- Length: 66:50
- Label: Independent
- Producer: Jim Bianco and Sarah Simon

Jim Bianco chronology
| Loudmouth (2011) | Cookie Cutter (2013) | Forniquette (2015) |

Cookie Cutter is the fourth official studio album by recording artist Jim Bianco.

Released October 1, 2013, this album was created as a pledge sponsored gift for fans participating in Bianco's 2010 Kickstarter campaign. Over the course of the 45-day campaign, Bianco was able to raise $31,500 to launch the release of his 2011 album LOUDMOUTH. Bianco's campaign success was featured in an article by Shanna Schwarze at CNN.com. Fans that pledged $500 or more to Bianco's Kickstarter campaign were given a questionnaire, which Bianco used to personalize a song about that person. "Cookie Cutter" is the result of this campaign gift, with proceeds of the sale given to charity benefiting veterans.

Bianco hosted a live concert performance at the Hudson Theater in Hollywood, CA in honor of the release on October 1, 2014. On October 2, 2013, Audie Cornish of NPR’s All Things Considered featured Bianco and his process of creating Cookie Cutter.

== Track listing ==
All songs written by Jim Bianco

1. "Apache"–4:10
2. "Kilpatrick Man"– 2:50
3. "California"– 3:08
4. "BTO" –5:28
5. "Jane"–4:10
6. "Blue Subaru"– 4:18
7. "Indiana Ballerina"–3:17
8. "Hey Princess"– 4:23
9. "Golden Rule"– 4:04
10. "I’ll Be There for You"–4:08
11. "Billy Baker"– 4:03
12. "Miracle"– 5:14
13. "Good to Have You Home" –4:12
14. "Single Malt Scotch"–2:48
15. "Breaking Your Heart"– 4:04
16. "It’s Gonna Be OK"–3:52
17. "That’s What She Said (Intro)"–1:36
18. "That’s What She Said"– 3:05

== Personnel ==
- James Babson
- Jillian Bianco
- Jim Bianco–lead vocals,
- Maureen Bianco
- Starla Coco Bolle
- Lelia Broussard
- Tim Davies
- Petra Haden
- Roger Hayden
- Jordan Katz
- Julia Kole
- Kevin Margulis
- Caesar Mattachiera
- Allie Moss
- Sabriena Simon
- Lenny Simon
- Sarah Simon
- Jon Svensong

== Additional production information ==
- Mixed by Nathanael Boone and Kenny Lyon
- Mastered by D James Gordon
- All introductions written by Jim Bianco and Sarah Simon
- Produced by Jim Bianco and Sarah Simon

== Studio information ==
Recorded at Steady Studios. Additional tracking at Boulevard Recording.

== The 69 Questions ==
1) Your full name?
2) Nicknames?
3) Are you over the age of 10?
4) Over the age of 20?
5) Town and county and state/province and street and zip code where you live?
6) Your current occupation?
7) Are both your parents still alive?
8) Your parents’ full names:
9) Your parents’ occupation when you were born:
10) What was the name of the street you grew up on?
11) Childhood hobbies?
12) Do you have any childhood memories from a vacation?
13) How about any childhood fascinations? (i.e. Firetrucks, Outer space, Mary Lou Retton, etc....)
14) Any albums/music from your childhood that stuck with you?
15) What was the name of your elementary school, middle school and high school?
16) What was the name of your first boyfriend/girlfriend?
17) What was the color, year, make and model of you first car (if any)?
18) What is the color, year, make and model of current car?
19) What was your most memorable childhood pet?
20) What was its name and what kind of animal?
21) How did it die?
22) Do you currently have pets?
23) Current pet names? What kind of animal?
24) Who were your neighbors growing up?
25) Who are your current neighbors?
26) Any tattoos?
27) Where?
28) Of what?
29) When did you get them?
30) Why?
31) Piercings?
32) Scars?
33) Where on your body?
34) When did you get it?
35) How?
36) Five favorite songs?
37) Five favorite albums?
38) Five favorite movies?
39) Favorite book?
40) Favorite Actor/Actress?
41) Favorite Color?
42) Current Hobbies?
43) History of places that you lived and ages you were there (i.e. Portland: 22-25, NYC 26-33, Charlotte, NC 33- 36)
44) Fears/phobias? (i.e. Clowns, spiders, rollercoasters, etc....)
45) Favorite Flavor Ice Cream?
46) Drinker?
47) Favorite libation(s)?
48) Smoker?
49) Brand of cigarettes?
50) Partaker of the occasional doobie?
51) Have you ever stolen anything?
52) When?
53) Where?
54) Why?
55) Who was the first person you slept with?
56) Do you have any allergies of any kind?
57) Eye color?
58) Any sayings/quotes that were passed down from your parents? (for example, my father has always said ‘Any port in a foreign storm’, and for some reason it stuck with me.)
59) Any favorite quotes, in general?
60) Do you live in an apartment or a house?
61) When was your first kiss?
62) With who?
63) Do you remember if it was good or bad?
64) Do you have children? (Boys? Girls? How many? )
65) What are their full names?
66) Currently Married, single, divorced or ‘in a relationship’?
67) Saddest event(s) in your life?
68) Happiest event(s) in your life?
69) What is your best summer memory?

== Videos ==
- Jim Bianco: Live at the HUDSON THEATER on YouTube
- That’s What She Said Official Video on YouTube
- Kickstarter Movie (2010)
- Gratitude on YouTube (2010)

== Jim Bianco on Cookie Cutter ==
- "I really tried to capture the experiences that unite and define us as people, so that not only would someone’s answer be relevant to them, obviously, but to someone listening who wasn’t that person."
- "My father is a Brooklyn-born weight-lifting Italian Roman Catholic who wields a pompadour and only drives a Cadillac. My mother is a kind, classic, 1950’s Brooklyn Jew who quit high school to work in a pencil factory. It’s pretty obvious where my obsession with eccentric characters comes from."
- "Centuries ago it was common for the church or the aristocracy to commission composers to create a piece of work for them. Whether it was for a royal wedding or a religious holiday, composers crafted the music for specific people or events.’Cookie Cutter’ is the modern version of that."
