= The Tenth Man =

The Tenth Man may refer to:

- The Tenth Man (1936 film), a British drama film based on a play by Somerset Maugham
- The Tenth Man (Chayefsky play), a 1959 play by Paddy Chayefsky
- The Tenth Man (novel), a 1985 novel by Graham Greene
  - The Tenth Man (1988 film), a television film based on Greene's novel
- The Tenth Man (2016 film), an Argentine drama film
