= Saving Grace =

Saving Grace may refer to:

- Grace (Christianity), a concept in Christian soteriology
- Saving Grace (American TV series), a 2007 American television series starring Holly Hunter
- Saving Grace (Philippine TV series), a 2024 Philippine drama series starring Julia Montes
- "Saving Grace" (short story), a 1990 short story by Orson Scott Card
- "Saving Grace" (Parker Lewis Can't Lose), a 1990 television episode
- Saving Grace (podcast), a podcast by the Fellas Studios hosted by GK Barry

== Film ==
- Saving Grace (1986 film), a film based on a novel by Celia Gittelson
- Saving Grace (1998 film), a New Zealand film based on a play by Duncan Sarkies
- Saving Grace (2000 film), a British film
- Saving Grace (2008 film), a film based on a Connie Stevens screenplay

== Music ==
=== Artists ===
- Saving Grace (band), a metal / hardcore band from New Zealand
- Saving Grace, Robert Plant's backing band, formed in 2019
- Saving Grace, former name of Canadian country music duo now known as One More Girl

=== Albums ===
- Saving Grace, a 2021 album by When Rivers Meet
- Saving Grace (Robert Plant album), 2025

=== Songs ===
- "Saving Grace" (Tom Petty song), a 2006 single by Tom Petty
- "Saving Grace" (Pete Murray song), a 2008 single by Pete Murray
- "Saving Grace", a song by Bob Dylan from Saved (1980)
- "Saving Grace", a song by Everlast
- "Saving Grace", a song by Christian female group Point of Grace
- "Saving Grace", a song by The Cranberries from Bury the Hatchet (1999)
- "Saving Grace", a song by The Pretenders from the album Loose Screw (2002)
- "Saving Grace", a song by The Maine from the album Black & White
