= Deterrence (film) =

- Theatrical release poster
- Directed by: Rod Lurie
- Written by: Rod Lurie
- Produced by: Marc Frydman; James Spies
- Starring: Kevin Pollak; Timothy Hutton; Sheryl Lee Ralph; Clotilde Courau; Sean Astin
- Cinematography: Frank Perl
- Edited by: Alan Roberts
- Music by: Larry Groupé
- Production companies: Moonstone Entertainment; TF1 International; Battleplan Productions
- Distributed by: Ariane Distribution (France); Paramount Classics (United States and United Kingdom)
- Release dates: September 10, 1999 (TIFF); March 10, 2000 (United States)
- Running time: 104 minutes
- Countries: France; United States
- Language: English
- Budget: $800,000
- Box office: $145,071

Deterrence is a 1999 political thriller drama film written and directed by Rod Lurie, depicting fictional events about nuclear brinkmanship. It marks the feature directorial debut of Lurie, who was previously a film critic for the New York Daily News, Premiere Magazine, Entertainment Weekly and Movieline, among others. Kevin Pollak, Timothy Hutton, Sheryl Lee Ralph and Sean Astin star. The film is an international co-production between France and the United States. It premiered at the 1999 Toronto International Film Festival, and was released in the United States on March 10, 2000, by Paramount Classics.

== Plot ==
In the spring of 2008, U.S. President Walter Emerson is visiting Colorado ahead of Super Tuesday in the primary elections for his party's nomination in the upcoming presidential election. Emerson, formerly an appointed Vice President who ascended to the Presidency four months earlier upon the death of his predecessor, is accompanied on his campaign tour by White House Chief of Staff Marshall Thompson, National Security Advisor Gayle Redford, his Secret Service protection detail and a television news crew documenting his campaign.

A freak blizzard traps Emerson and his entourage at a diner in the remote town of Aztec, occupied by chef and owner Harvey, waitress Katie, local resident Ralph and married tourists Taylor and Lizzie Woods. President Emerson greets all the civilians in turn just before news arrives that Iraq has invaded Kuwait on the orders of Iraqi President Uday Hussein. Emerson and his team also learn that in the process of invasion, Iraqi troops killed a UN peacekeeping mission largely staffed by U.S. armed forces and medical personnel.

In response, President Emerson makes a worldwide address from the diner, using the television crew following his campaign. During the speech, Emerson gives Hussein an ultimatum to cease his invasion of Kuwait and submit himself to the U.S. embassy in Iraq for arrest within 90 minutes, or else Emerson will authorize a nuclear strike on Baghdad. Emerson's ultimatum shocks both his staff and the civilians in the diner as he had not revealed his intentions before making the speech. When questioned by Redford, Emerson defends his decision by arguing that with the vast majority of U.S. military forces engaged in the ongoing "Second Korean War" and an undoubted act of aggression by Hussein against a U.S. ally, a nuclear strike is the only appropriate option to reinforce U.S. supremacy and decisively halt Iraq's invasion of Kuwait.

Hussein communicates through his United Nations envoy and refuses to back down despite Emerson's threat. Discussions between Emerson and the envoy grow heated, with the latter citing Emerson's status as a non-elected leader and his Jewish faith as reasons why Hussein does not take him seriously. At the same time, Emerson, Redford and Thompson coordinate with various members of the National Security Council and Joint Chiefs of Staff by phone in order to manage the crisis and plan for the potential use of nuclear weapons against Iraq to carry out Emerson's threat.

As negotiations with Iraq break down, Hussein threatens to fire Iraq's black-market nuclear missiles at many locations within the U.S. and its NATO allies, notably including the location of the NORAD command centre in Colorado close to where Emerson is based. The U.S. learns that Iraq purchased their black-market weapons from France, supposedly an ally of the U.S., whilst it is also revealed that sites of Iraqi missile launchers include other traditional opponents of the U.S., such as Libya and North Korea. In a conversation with Emerson, the President of France is cavalier about the situation and freely admits that France sold nuclear weapons to Iraq. Emerson subsequently talks privately with the French leader but does not reveal the contents of the conversation to his advisors.

With the crisis continuing to escalate, Emerson and his team are confronted with the opinions of the civilians within the diner. Harvey, Katie and the Woods' oppose using nuclear weapons whilst Ralph tells Emerson that he will have the vote of every "real" American if he carries out his threat in defense of U.S. forces. In a conversation with the First Lady over the telephone, Emerson also discovers that his wife opposes his course of action. Despite her opposition and that of Redford and Thompson, Emerson remains adamant in his strategy and states he is wholly prepared to carry out the threat if necessary. He orders a B-2 nuclear bomber to cross Iraq's airspace despite the threats of the Iraqi envoy that this would constitute an act of war. In retaliation, the Iraqis begin targeting their 23 nuclear missiles against the U.S. and its NATO allies as per their earlier threat.

Out of desperation and anger, the diner owner Harvey suddenly brandishes a shotgun and shoots dead Captain Coddington, the military officer carrying the nuclear football with which Emerson can activate the nuclear strike. Harvey is killed by the Secret Service agents in return, devastating Katie, whilst Emerson expresses sorrow that Coddington was killed doing his duty. Despite Harvey's action, Emerson is still able to obtain the nuclear codes via phone from the Joint Chiefs, although this results in the resignation of Admiral Miller, a senior military officer who had been critical of Emerson's approach throughout the crisis. With time for Hussein to submit to Emerson's ultimatum having run out, Emerson authorizes the nuclear strike and speaks to the crew of the B-2 bomber who will carry out the strike.

The nuclear bomb, approximately 100 megatons in force, results in the complete destruction of Baghdad. Iraq's retaliation begins and the majority of their missiles are shot down by NATO missile defense systems. Whilst some of Iraq's missiles successfully land on their targets, their nuclear warheads do not detonate; Baghdad is the only city destroyed—a development that surprises Emerson's staff.

As the snowstorm eases up, Emerson addresses the world once more via a TV broadcast. In the speech, Emerson reveals that it was actually the U.S. government that secretly sold nuclear weapons to Iraq, using the French as intermediaries whilst pretending to know nothing about it. The plan was carried out in order to prevent Iraq from gaining an independent, fully capable nuclear arsenal by instead selling them deliberately sabotaged missiles that could never function properly. As to why he carried out the threat against Iraq, Emerson publicly justifies his actions as a firm display that the U.S. would be prepared to defend itself from military threats with nuclear weapons if necessary. Privately, Emerson also predicts that his use of nuclear weapons will coerce China and North Korea into conceding the Second Korean War within months.

Just before Emerson and his entourage leave the diner, Redford and Thompson ask what he meant by a "significant announcement" from the White House when they return to Washington. Emerson reveals that he plans to withdraw from the presidential campaign and serve out the rest of his predecessor's term rather than run for one of his own. In this, Emerson still justifies his actions during the crisis but concedes someone else should be the one to carry on the job of leading the U.S. in the future.

== Cast ==
- Kevin Pollak as President Walter Emerson
- Timothy Hutton as White House Chief of Staff Marshall Thompson
- Sean Astin as Ralph
- Sheryl Lee Ralph as National Security Advisor Gayle Redford
- James Handy as Lancaster / President Buchanan
- Clotilde Courau as Katie
- Badja Djola as Harvey
- Mark Thompson as Gerald Irvin
- Michael Mantell as Taylor Woods
- Kathryn Morris as Lizzie Woods

== Reception ==
=== Critical reaction ===
Film critic Stephen Holden gave the film a mixed review, writing: "The threat of nuclear war may have receded in the last two decades, but it certainly hasn't disappeared. That's why a movie like Deterrence, Rod Lurie's clunky political thriller about nuclear brinksmanship in the near future, probably serves some useful purpose, despite its ham-fisted preachiness and mediocre acting...With its blunt admonitory tone and single-set location (reminiscent of 12 Angry Men), it often has the feel of a high school civics lesson packaged as melodrama. Its editorial pretensions are underscored by an opening black-and-white montage of actual presidents from Franklin D. Roosevelt through Bill Clinton lambasting war."

Critic Roger Ebert, on the other hand, liked the film, writing: "And yet the film works. It really does. I got caught up in the global chess game, in the bluffing and the dares, the dangerous strategy of using nuclear blackmail against a fanatic who might call the bluff. With one set and low-rent props (is that an ordinary laptop inside the nuclear briefcase "football"?), Deterrence manufactures real suspense and considers real issues...Kevin Pollak makes a curiously convincing third-string president—a man not elected to the office, but determined to fill it. He is a Jew, which complicates his Middle East negotiations and produces a priceless theological discussion with the waitress (Clotilde Courau). He is advised by his chief of staff (Timothy Hutton) and his national security adviser (Sheryl Lee Ralph), who are appalled by his nuclear brinkmanship and who are both completely convincing in their roles. The screenplay gives them dialogue of substance; the situation may be contrived, but we're absorbed in the urgent debate that it inspires."

=== Box office ===
Produced for a budget of $800,000, the film managed to only make $145,071 at the box office, making Deterrence a box office flop. The film only grossed $23,318 in its opening weekend.
