= Handsome Devil (album) =

Studio album by Jim Bianco
- Released: 2004
- Genre: Acoustic Rock
- Length: 41:24 minutes
- Label: Independent
- Producers: Jim Bianco and Brad Gordon

Jim Bianco chronology
Jim Bianco and the Tim Davies Big Band (2003)	Handsome Devil (2004)	Steady (2006)

Handsome Devil is the first official studio album released by recording artist Jim Bianco. The song "So Far, So Good" was featured on an episode of HBO's "Real Sex" and also used in a German car commercial in 2009. In August 2010, "So Far So Good" was featured in episode 33 of "True Blood" on HBO. In the 2005/2006 season, A&E's show "Random 1" featured the following songs over the course of three episodes:

- "Untended Fires"
- "Best That You Can Do"
- "Sorry"
  and
- "Tennessee Wedding"

== Track listing ==
All songs were written by Jim Bianco

1. “Best That You Can Do“– 3:51
2. “Handsome Devil“– 4:09
3. “Goodness Gracious“– 3:58
4. “Sorry” –3:55
5. “The River Waltz“– 3:22
6. “Tennessee Wedding“– 4:48
7. “So Far, So Good“– 3:47
8. “More Hands“– 3:15
9. “Ready or Not“– 4:44
10. “Untended Fires“– 3:22
11. “Handsome Devil (Reprise)” –4:53

== Personnel ==
- Jim Bianco–lead vocals, acoustic guitars, piano on 4 and 7, electric guitar on 1 and 8
- Brad Gordon – accordion, winds and brass, piano/electronic piano/organ, background vocals
- Jason Pipkin –d rums and percussion
- Josef Zimmerman – double bass and additional background vocals on 1, 6, 7 and 9
- Matt DeMerritt – tenor saxophone
- Kenny Lyon–electric guitars on 2, 3, 4, 7, 9 and nylon on 11
- Gary Jules – background vocals on “Tennessee Wedding”
- Petra Haden– violin on “River Waltz” and all female vocals
- Dr. Gonorbad – vibes on 8 and 10
- Bang Dordor – chamberlain on 10
- Rob Barndog – castanets on 11
- Vincent Mourou – francais

== Production information ==
- Produced by Brad Gordon and Jim Bianco
- Mastered by Matt Mariano at mmmusic
- All photography by Miles Eastman at Quixote Studios
- Art design by Jim Bianco and Tammy Bumann
- Art production by Tammy Bumann
- Basic tracks recorded by Jeff Gross at Jag144 Studios.
- Everything else recorded by Brad Gordon at Magic Carpet Studios.
- "More Hands" was recorded completely at Magic Carpet Studios.
- Kenny Lyon’s guitar work was recorded at the Gaylord-6th floor.

== Jim Bianco on Handsome Devil ==
- "I call "Handsome Devil" my sex record, because there’s a sexual theme throughout the whole thing. It’s about the tenacity of the male libido. When I perform songs from that record, I always feel successful when people understand that I’m in character. I’m sort of speaking from the perspective of a full-on testosterone-charged male running on a thousand gallons of fuel—saying whatever he wants to without consequences."
- “These songs aren’t cynical; they’re dark. This shows a side of males that they often try to hide, but which can be found to some extent in all of us. The difference with the character is that he doesn’t try to suppress or hide any of this. He’s unaware of the consequences of these actions until they happen, but then he has to deal with them.”

== Videos ==
Bianco filmed and produced one video for this album.
Best That You Can Do
