= Hotel Café =

Live music venue in Hollywood, Los Angeles, California, USA

The Hotel Café
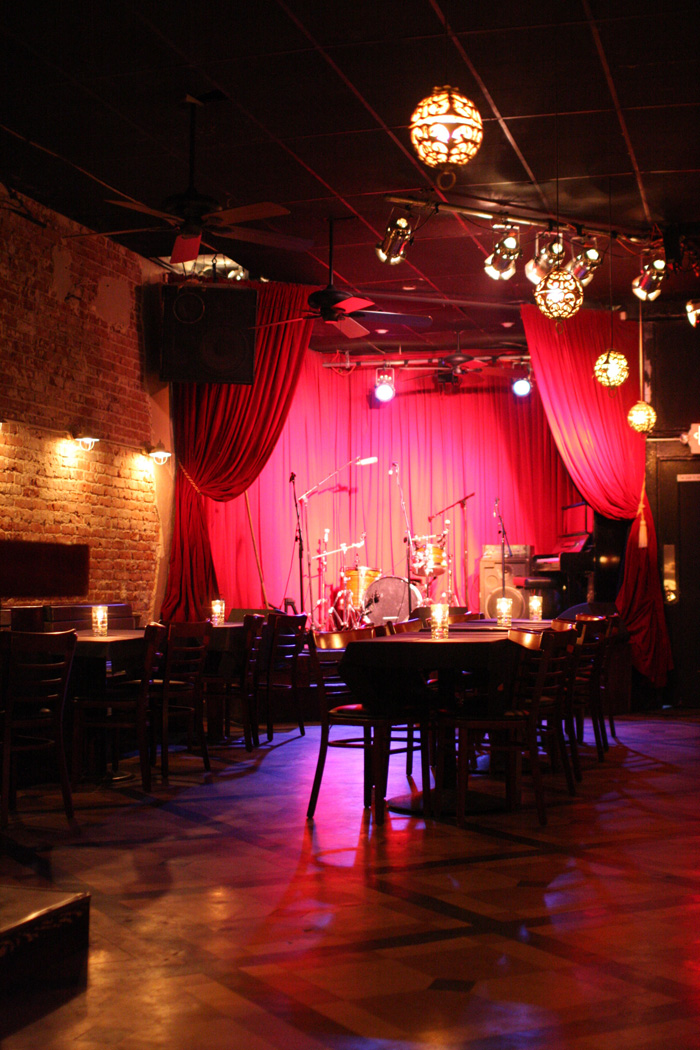
- The Hotel Café in 2009
- Interactive map of The Hotel Café
- Location: Cahuenga Boulevard, Hollywood, California, United States
- Coordinates: 34.100412°N 118.329979°W
- Owner: Max Mamikunian & Marko Shafer
- Capacity: 200
- Event: Music venue

Construction
- Opened: 2000

Website
- www.hotelcafe.com

The Hotel Café is a live music venue located off an alley on the Cahuenga Boulevard strip in Hollywood, California, United States, that has become known for helping to establish the careers of new singer-songwriters in the 2000s. It began as a coffee shop, but gained a reputation as an intimate performance space featuring acoustic-based songwriters. The venue has become its own brand, with its Hotel Café Tour, a record label, and two albums, Live at the Hotel Café, Volume 1, and The Hotel Café Presents...Winter Songs.

== History ==
When The Hotel Café opened in 2000, it operated as a coffee shop where singer-songwriters came to perform their material for small audiences. Co-owner Maximillian Mamikunian has noted that in the venue's early days, turning a profit was challenging, as the cafe's steamers and blenders could only be run between songs so as not to drown them out. In 2004, the club acquired space next door and underwent expansion for eight months. The venue's main room still had its five original elevated bar tables running along a hallway linking the front and back of the club, as well as six dinner tables set immediately in front of the stage.

In November 2025, the venue announced its closure at this location in early 2026 with the intention of reopening at a new undetermined location the following year.

== Significant activities ==
Since 2004, the club has curated an annual group musical tour. Past featured artists have included Gary Jules, Jim Bianco, Sara Bareilles, Meiko, Rachael Yamagata, Brooke Fraser, and many others. Most stops are in the United States, but past tours have also included performances in Norway and Switzerland.

The Hotel Café's website, like the venue itself, has served as a source for new artists to be tapped by music enthusiasts and industry professionals alike. Grey's Anatomy music supervisor Alexandra Patsavas has used both the website and club itself as sources for discovering artists and songs she uses on the show. Meiko, an artist who hit the No. 1 folk spot on iTunes in August 2008, was discovered by Patsavas via The Hotel Café, as was the English singer-songwriter Adele. Another artist favored by Patsavas for use on Grey's Anatomy, Greg Laswell, has praised the club for its "rare" environment and has become one of its regulars.
