= K-Ville =

K-Ville may refer to:

- Krzyzewskiville, a line of students wishing to gain access to basketball games at Duke University
- K-Ville (TV series), a 2007 television series on Fox
- Kville Hundred, Bohuslän, Sweden
- Kernersville, North Carolina
