= Me and You and Everyone We Know =

2005 film by Miranda July

- Theatrical release poster
- Directed by: Miranda July
- Written by: Miranda July
- Produced by: Gina Kwon
- Starring: John Hawkes; Miranda July; Miles Thompson; Brandon Ratcliff
- Cinematography: Chuy Chavez
- Edited by: Andrew Dickler; Charles Ireland
- Music by: Michael Andrews
- Production companies: IFC Productions; FilmFour
- Distributed by: IFC Films (United States); Optimum Releasing (United Kingdom); Happinet Pictures (Japan)
- Release dates: January 2005 (Sundance); June 17, 2005 (United States); August 19, 2005 (United Kingdom); April 8, 2006 (Japan)
- Running time: 91 minutes
- Countries: United States; United Kingdom; Japan
- Language: English
- Budget: $800,000
- Box office: $8 million

Me and You and Everyone We Know is a 2005 romantic comedy-drama film written and directed by Miranda July. She also acts in the starring role, opposite John Hawkes. The film was the first major studio production for July, who had been known previously for her self-produced short films and performance art.

== Plot ==
The structure of the film consists of several subplots which all revolve around an intertwined cast of characters.

Richard is a shoe salesman and recently separated father of two. After being thrown out by his wife Pam, he gets an apartment of his own to share with his sons, 14-year-old Peter and six-year-old Robby. He meets Christine, a senior-cab driver and amateur video artist, while she takes her client to shop for shoes, and the two develop a fledgling romantic relationship.

Peter and Robby have a joint online chat, which Robby later depicts in another chat session as "))<>((", an emoticon that means "pooping back and forth, forever." This piques the interest of the woman at the other end and she suggests a face-to-face meeting.

Meanwhile, Christine wants to hand a videotape of her work to Nancy, the curator of a contemporary art museum, who impatiently tells her to submit it by mail; when she does, Nancy watches and accepts it. Nancy turns out to be the woman who was instant messaging with the brothers, and when she and Robby meet at a park, she realizes he is a child, kisses him and walks away.

Two of Richard's teenage neighbors, Heather and Rebecca, develop a playful relationship with a much older neighbor named Andrew, who works in the shoe store with Richard. He does not say much, but he continually leaves signs on his window detailing what he would do to each of them. As a result of this relationship, Heather and Rebecca ask Peter if they can practice oral sex on him, so that he can tell them which of the two does it better; so they do. He says both were exactly the same. Sylvie, the young daughter of a neighbor, peeks in the window, sees what is happening, and quickly leaves. Heather and Rebecca later come to Andrew's house intending to have sex with him as practice, but he appears afraid when he sees them through his window and he pretends not to be home.

Peter develops a friendship with Sylvie, having been introduced to the hope chest that she has. Christine and Richard display mutual acceptance of their attraction to each other. Robby eventually finds that the noise he had awoken to early every morning was that of an early-rising businessman tapping a quarter on a street sign pole. When Robby asks why he is doing it, he stops and turns around, says "I'm just passing the time", and gives Robby the quarter. When his bus drives away and Robby tries it out himself, the sun heightens with each tap, time literally passing as he does it.

== Cast ==
- John Hawkes as Richard Swersey
- Miranda July as Christine Jesperson
- Miles Thompson as Peter Swersey
- Brandon Ratcliff as Robby Swersey
- Carlie Westerman as Sylvie
- Hector Elias as Michael
- Brad William Henke as Andrew
- Natasha Slayton as Heather
- Najarra Townsend as Rebecca
- Tracy Wright as Nancy Herrington
- JoNell Kennedy as Pam
- Ellen Geer as Ellen
- Colette Kilroy as Sylvie's mom
- James Kayten as Sylvie's dad
- Jordan Potter as Shamus

== Production ==
The film was shot using a Sony HDW-F900 CineAlta high definition digital video camera.

On-line chat scenes were filmed with open-source Gaim software, now known as Pidgin.

== Music ==
The score, composed by Michael Andrews, was performed largely on a modified Casio SK-1 sampling keyboard. The soundtrack was released on July 12, 2005.

Me and You and Everyone We Know: Original Score track listing
| No. | Title | Artist | Length |
|---|---|---|---|
| 1. | "When I Call a Name" | Michael Andrews | 3:51 |
| 2. | "Goldfish" | Michael Andrews | 1:55 |
| 3. | "What's That Sound?" | Michael Andrews | 1:58 |
| 4. | "Socks on Ears" | Michael Andrews | 3:01 |
| 5. | "Signs" | Michael Andrews | 2:40 |
| 6. | "5 on a Joyride" | Cody Chesnutt | 3:33 |
| 7. | "I'm Not Following You" | Michael Andrews | 3:10 |
| 8. | "Library Chat" | Michael Andrews | 2:50 |
| 9. | "Me and You Shoes" | Michael Andrews | 1:17 |
| 10. | "Mirror" | Michael Andrews | 3:39 |
| 11. | "Peter and Sylvie" | Michael Andrews | 3:21 |
| 12. | "F***" | Michael Andrews | 2:01 |
| 13. | "Any Way That You Want Me" | Spiritualized | 6:27 |
| 14. | "Boy Moves the Sun" | Michael Andrews | 3:38 |
| 15. | "A Summer Long Since Passed" | Virginia Astley | 4:36 |
| 16. | "Heaven in Five" | Michael Andrews | 2:44 |

== Reception ==
Me and You and Everyone We Know received largely positive reviews. On the review aggregator website Rotten Tomatoes, the film holds an approval rating of 82% based on 117 reviews, with an average rating of 7.4/10. The website's critics consensus reads, "Miranda July's debut feature is a charmingly offbeat and observant film about people looking for love." Metacritic, which uses a weighted average, assigned the film a score of 76 out of 100, based on 38 critics, indicating "generally favorable" reviews.

The film won the Caméra d'Or at the 2005 Cannes Film Festival.

Roger Ebert cited it as the fifth best film of the 2000s.
