= Gary Jules =

American singer-songwriter (born 1969)

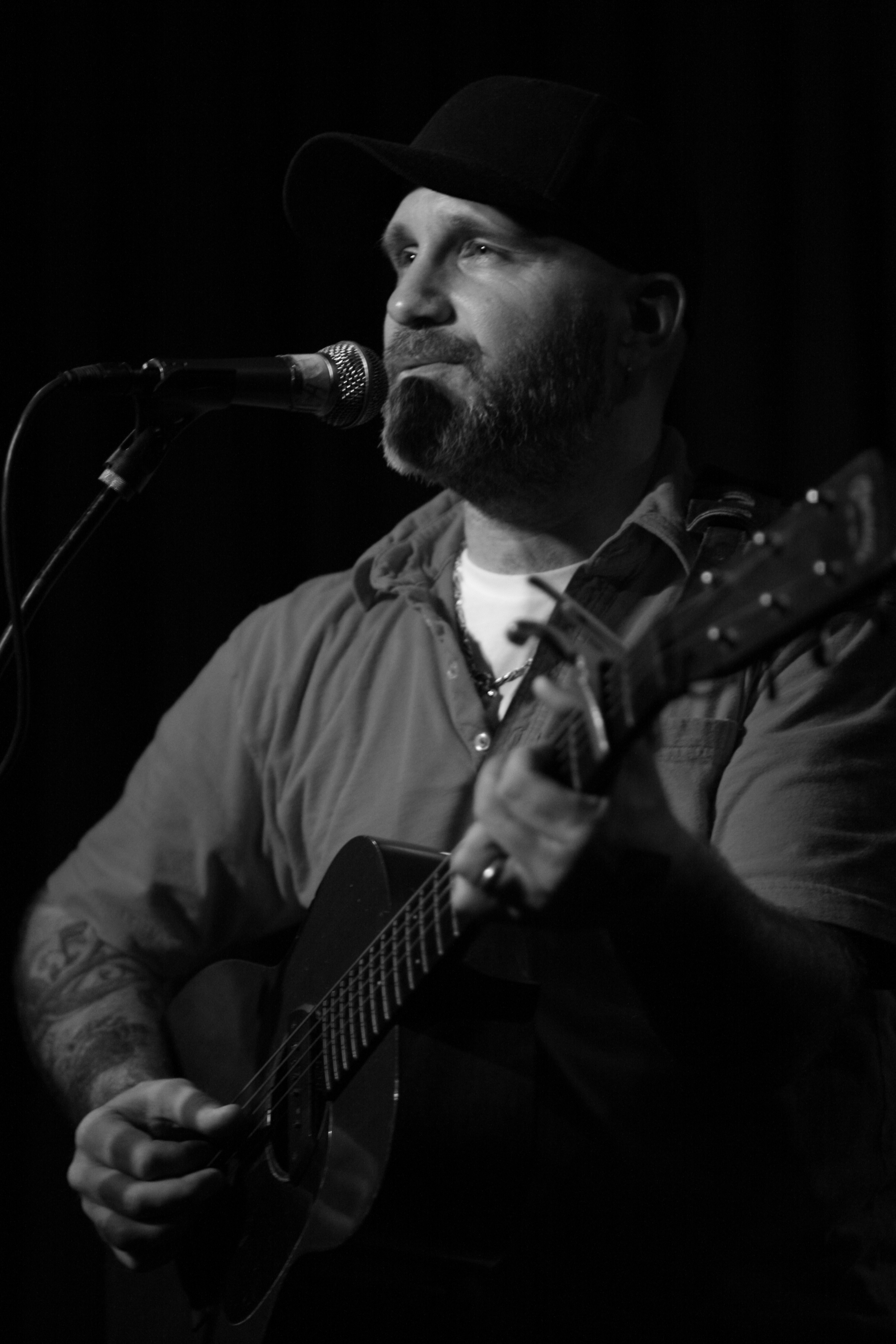
- Gary Jules performing live at the Hotel Café on December 9, 2008

Background information
- Born: Gary Jules Aguirre Jr. March 19, 1969 (age 57); Fresno, California, U.S.
- Genres: Rock; pop; folk; soft rock
- Occupation: Singer-songwriter
- Instruments: Vocals; guitar; piano; mandolin; harmonica; ukulele
- Years active: 1990–present
- Labels: A&M; Sanctuary; Down Up Down Music
- Website: garyjules.com

Gary Jules Aguirre Jr. (born March 19, 1969) is an American singer-songwriter, known primarily for his cover version of the Tears for Fears song "Mad World", which he recorded with his friend Michael Andrews for the film Donnie Darko (2001). It became the UK Christmas number-one single of 2003.

== Early life ==
Gary Jules was born in Fresno, California to Marie and Gary Aguirre. His family is descendant from Oklahoma, Ireland, France, Mexico and Spain. He attended The Bishop's School in La Jolla, California.

== Songs ==
Jules recorded a cover of the song "Mad World" by Tears for Fears for the 2001 film Donnie Darko and released it as a single in December 2003. This timing allowed it to become the Christmas Number One single in the UK for that year.

He sang the cover on stage as a guest in a duet with French singer composer Mylène Farmer during her "Timeless" 2013 tour.

The cover also featured as background music in various television programs such as drama General Hospital, as well as individual episodes of Without a Trace, The O.C., Smallville, Jericho, CSI: Crime Scene Investigation, House and Riverdale.

The cover was used in the trailer for the 2010 film, The Crazies, and the Cavaliers Drum and Bugle Corps' 2010 Production, "Mad World".

In 2016, a piano cover influenced by Jules's version was released by artist Jennifer Ann and used in a commercial for Lloyd's Bank, which featured a horse galloping through different stages in people's lives.

Adam Lambert sang a cover of "Mad World" that was heavily influenced by Jules's version at two different points in his American Idol competition, as well as during the American Idols Live! 2009 tour. Following its appearance on the popular television show, Jules's cover of the song rose to No. 11 on the iTunes Store.

Electronic music producer Phutureprimitive remixed the Gary Jules version of "Mad World" and released it as an MP3 file in 2011 with an accompanying video.

The song "Something Else" was featured on the season 5 episode "My Fallen Idol" of the NBC show Scrubs.

The song "Gone Daddy" is based upon an experience that led to Jules relocating his family from Southern California to North Carolina. A neighbor was gunned down one night in Los Angeles and while the police were investigating the shooting, Jules approached one of the officers, explained that his child was napping, and asked if the officer knew when they would be finished. The officer said he did not know, but that the family could leave Los Angeles if they didn't like it. Jules took the advice to heart and relocated shortly thereafter.

Jules's song "Wichita" was inspired by a class he took at UCLA regarding Native American history. During the class he read a story about Native Americans following herds of bison around the nation to survive.

Jules was a surprise guest on a series of Parisian concerts of French singer Mylène Farmer, called Timeless 2013 (September 2013). In all the performances that take place in the Palais omnisport de Bercy, Gary Jules sings his cover of Mad World joined by Mylène Farmer. They follow by the duet song "Les Mots" that Mylène Farmer originally released in 2001 with Seal. So far Gary Jules is also part of the tour, as he was also performing during the concerts in Lyon.

== Career ==
=== Music videos ===
- "Mad World", directed by Michel Gondry (2003)
- "Broke Window" (2004)
- "Beautiful", stop animation by Tony Clavelli (2009)

=== Television placements ===
- CBS CSI: Crime Scene Investigation ("Mad World", season 1, episode 1: Pilot. Aired October 6, 2000.)
- The WB Smallville ("Mad World", season 2, episode 11: Visage. Aired January 14, 2003.)
- NBC Third Watch ("Mad World", season 4, episode 15: Collateral Damage: Part 2. Aired February 10, 2003.)
- CBS Without a Trace ("Mad World", season 2, episode 1: The Bus. Aired September 25, 2003.)
- ABC Alias ("Something Else", season 3, episode 3: Reunion. Aired October 12, 2003.)
- CBS CSI: Crime Scene Investigation ("Mad World", season 6, episode 2: Room Service. Aired September 29, 2005.)
- CBS CSI: Crime Scene Investigation ("Mad World", season 6, episode 14: Killer. Aired February 2, 2006.)
- NBC Scrubs ("Something Else", season 5, episode 21: My Fallen Idol. Aired May 2, 2006.)
- CBS CSI: Crime Scene Investigation ("Mad World", season 6, episode 24: Way to Go. Aired May 18, 2006.)
- ABC Grey's Anatomy ("Falling Awake", season 3, episode 12: Six Days: Part 2. Aired January 4, 2007.)
- CBS Jericho ("Mad World", season 1, episode 17: One Man's Terrorist. Aired April 4, 2007.)
- ABC Brothers & Sisters ("Falling Awake", season 1, episode 21: Grapes of Wrath. Aired May 6, 2007.)
- TV3 Colors en sèrie (Spain) ("Mad World", Negre: El túnel al final de la llum.2007)
- A&E The Cleaner ("Mad World", season 1, episode 6: To Catch a Fed. Aired August 26, 2008.)
- CW 90210 ("Greetings from the Side", season 1, episode 9: Secrets and Lies. Aired November 4, 2008.)
- NBC Friday Night Lights ("Beautiful", season 3, episode 13: Tomorrow Blues. Aired January 14, 2009.)
- NBC Life ("Been a Long Time", episode 215: I Heart Mom. Aired February 18, 2009)
- FX: Nip/Tuck ("Mad World", season 6, episode 2 Enigma Aired October 21, 2009.)
- CW Life Unexpected ("Falling Awake", season 1, episode 1: Pilot. Aired January 18, 2010.)
- ABC Private Practice ("The Old Days Are Gone", season 3, episode 12: Best Laid Plans. Aired January 21, 2010.)
- ABC General Hospital ("Mad World" – 23 episodes as Franco)
- FOX So You Think You Can Dance? ("Mad World" (alternate version) (season 7, week 7. Aired July 28, 2010.)
- ID Investigation Discovery Stolen Voices, Buried Secrets ("Mad World (2011)
- SYFY Being Human ("Mad World", season 1, episode 9 Aired March 2011.)
- SYFY Helix ("Mad World", season 1, episode 9 "Level X" Aired February 28, 2014.)
- SoHo (Australia) Wentworth ("Mad World", season 2, episode 9 "The Fixer" Aired May 20, 2014.)
- FOX Family Guy ("Mad World", season 15, episode 16 "Saturated Fat Guy" Aired March 19, 2017.)
- Showtime Dexter: Resurrection ("Mad World" (newly recorded version plays over the end credits) (season 1, episode 9 "Touched by an Ángel" Aired August 29, 2025.)

=== Movie placements ===
- Digging to China – "Greetings from the Side" (1997)
- Donnie Darko (2001) ("Mad World")
- Catch and Release – "Pills" (2006)
- Lost Islands – "Mad World" (2008)
- Fireflies in the Garden – "Greetings from the Side" (2008)
- The Boondock Saints II: All Saints Day – "Mad World" (2009)
- I Will Follow You into the Dark – "Mad World" (2010)
- Mad World – "Mad World" (2010)

=== Trailers ===
- Xbox 360 Gears of War: "Mad World" (2006)
- The Cleaner – "Mad World" (2008)
- The Crazies – "Mad World" (2009)

=== Documentaries ===
- Michel Gondry 2: More Videos (Before and After DVD 1) (2009)
  - appears in the "Mad World" segment
- Joseph Aguirre's Next Year Country (2009)
  - soundtrack music

=== Theater ===
The playwright Stephen Adly Guirgis refers to Gary Jules in his play The Little Flower of East Orange. This show, directed by Philip Seymour Hoffman and starring Ellen Burstyn, premiered at The Public Theater in New York on April 6, 2008. The songs "Goodnight Billie" and "Little Greenie" were featured in the production. Specifically, in Act 1, Scene 3, the character Nadine plays "Little Greenie" and says "Okay...One time, I was gonna kill myself, but then I played this Gary Jules song like twenty-seven times." In the acknowledgments section of the Faber & Faber published version of the play, Guirgis thanks Jules for the music.

== Discography ==
=== Albums ===
- Greetings from the Side (1998)
- Trading Snakeoil for Wolftickets (2001) - U.S. No. 144
- Gary Jules (2006)
- Bird (2008)

=== EPs ===
- Live at Lime Presents Gary Jules (2009)
- Daytrotter Session (2009)

=== Singles ===
Year	Single	Peak positions									
Year	Single	AUS	AUT	BEL (FL)	DEN	FRA	GER	NED	SWE	SWI	UK
2003	"Mad World" (Michael Andrews featuring Gary Jules)	28	13	12	2	30	3	4	10	23	1

=== Collaborations ===
- Michael Andrews – Donnie Darko (2001)
  - Track 17 "Mad World" and Track 18 "Mad World (Alternate Mix)" (featured)
- Jim Bianco – Handsome Devil (2004)
  - Track 6 "Tennessee Wedding" (background vocals)
- Esquimaux – perfecto! (2005)
  - Track 12 "Honey & Dear" (featured duet with Heather Brown Dodge)
- Jim Bianco – Sing (2008)
  - Track 2 "Sing" and Track 6 "If Your Mama Knew" (background vocals)
- Angel Taylor – Love Travels (2009)
  - guitar, mandolin, background vocals
- Mylène Farmer – Timeless 2013 (2013)
  - Track 8 "Mad World" and Track 9 "Les mots" (live duets with Mylène Farmer)
- Equal - 'Lost in the Evening" (feat Gary Jules) (2013)
  - vocals
