= Kenny Lyon =

American guitarist (born 1956)

- Born: 22 April 1956 (age 70); Coral Gables, Florida, U.S.
- Instruments: Bass, guitar, keyboards
- Years active: 1975–present
- Website: kennylyon.tumblr.com

Kenny Lyon (born April 22, 1956) is an American guitarist, bassist, music producer, and author. He has performed and recorded with artists such as the Lemonheads, Jann Arden, NOFX, Mark Curry, Los Super Elegantes, Joel Virgel, Jim Bianco, and Brazzaville. He has also produced many kinds of music (including Chicano gangster rap, having produced some of the genre's biggest L.A. names: Mr. D, Sleepy Malo, Fank V., many of the original Southland Records cds.)

== Life and career ==
Born in Coral Gables, Florida, Lyon spent his fifth and sixth years in the Belgian Congo, and twelfth and sixteenth in Seville, Spain (where he began playing guitar). Back in the United States, he attended Vero Beach Senior High School (where he played bass in the school jazz band), the University of Florida, and the University of Miami. In Vero Beach, he was active in a number of acts, one of which, Axehammer, was popular in local nightclubs. Lyon later moved to Los Angeles, CA, with percussionist and Vero Beach native, Michael Rogers, who also attended the University of Miami.

He was in many bands during the 1980s and early 1990s, including Jim Ehinger's Los Angeles China Club house band, which backed up artists as diverse as Rick James, Elton John, Bruce Springsteen, Sting, Herbie Hancock, John Entwistle, Chaka Khan, and Joe Walsh, to name a few of the acts who played on Los Angeles' most notorious Monday jam nights.

Lyon's first major tour was as keyboardist with the Australian band Divinyls during the 1986-87 Australian Made Tour with INXS and Jimmy Barnes, as well as several regional tours of Australia.

Returning from this tour he spent thirteen months writing the novel Three Monkeys. During this time he also recorded with Paul Roessler and played in the band Twisted Roots, as well as with Priscilla and Rita Coolidge, David Baerwald, and others.

After recording and touring with Mark Curry, recording with Jann Arden, and recording with Doc Lawrence, Lyon moved to New York, eventually recording and touring with The Lemonheads beginning in 1996. The association lasted until 2004.

Brazzaville, formed with David Brown, David Ralicke, Mike Boito, Smokey Hormel, Danny Frankel, and Joel Virgel in 1998, recorded eight cds and spent years touring – still ongoing – in Russia, Ukraine, Turkey, Central Asia and the Caucuses, and China. In addition, the band backed up Los Angeles Peabody Award-winning spoken word artist Joe Frank. This turned into an association that has lasted until this day, involving many live performances and work on the recorded music for Frank's many radio and live shows. Lyon writes with and produces the work of solo artists Joel Virgel and Larkin Mclean, among others.

In 2015 he toured as guitarist with Josh Haden and the band Spain. This led to being the producer of the new project by Spain, Carolina, and performing in its summer, 2016 European support tour.

Lyon is also a founding member of Dangerbird Records recording artists The Night Sea, the improvisational music of which - coupled with stunning live visuals - is currently being performed - and filmed - in such interesting places as Joshua Tree, Death Valley, and the Masonic Hall at the Hollywood Forever cemetery. In addition to performing and producing music, and writing Three Monkeys, Lyon has written essays, screenplays, and short stories.

== Partial Discography ==
Year	Band / Artist	Album	Role
2016	Spain	Carolina	Producer, engineer, mixer, guitars, steel guitar, dobro, banjo, keyboards
2010	Kenny Lyon	OneGuyFourDaysFiveBucks	solo album
2011	Brazzaville	Jet Lag Poetry	guitars, pedal steel
2013	Brazzaville	Morro Bay	acoustic and electric guitars, steel guitar
2008	Kenny Lyon	Nathaniel's Playhouse	solo album
2007	Brazzaville	Somnambulista	bass, guitar
2007	Laura Bell Bundy	Longing for a Place Already Gone	guitar, bass, dobro, keyboards, engineering, production.
2006	Brazzaville	East L.A. Breeze	guitar
2005	Joel Virgel	Amor Amer	guitar, bass, composer, arranger
2004	Brazzaville	Welcome to... Brazzaville	bass, guitar
2002	Los Super Elegantes	Channelizing Paradise	bass
2002	Brazzaville	Rouge on Pockmarked Cheeks	guitar, producer
1999	Brazzaville	2002	bass, guitar, organ
1996	Lemonheads	Car Button Cloth	guitar
1994	NOFX	Punk in Drublic	guitar, vocals
1993	Jann Ardan	Time for Mercy	bass
1992	Mark Curry	It's Only Time	bass, guitar
1994	Mark Curry	Let The Wretched Come Home	production, bass
