= Elmwood Casino =

Historic casino in Windsor, Ontario, Canada

- 1946
- Location: Windsor, Ontario; 2335 Dougall Avenue
- Opened: May 8, 1946; 80 years ago
- Closed: December 21, 1974; 51 years ago
- Owner: Al Siegel

The Elmwood Casino, once known as the "Showspot of Canada," was a nightclub situated on Dougall Avenue in Windsor, Ontario. It was located not far from Detroit, just across the Detroit River.

== History ==
The Elmwood Casino opened in the mid-1940s and was open for almost 30 years. Due to financial problems, owner Al Siegel voluntarily filed for bankruptcy and closed the nightclub in December 1974.

Elmwood was major venue during its heyday.

Trumpeter Harry Gozzard was a member of the Elmwood Casino orchestra during the latter part of his musical career.

Celebrities like Frankie Avalon, Sammy Davis Jr. and Sonny and Cher played golf at the nearby Woodall Golf Centre when they wanted to relax during their time away from performing on stage at the Elmwood Casino.

During Queen Elizabeth II's Royal Tour of Canada in 1959, her entourage visited the Elmwood.

The Brentwood Recovery Home subsequently opened (in 1984) in same building.

In April 2024, George Gozzard, son of the late Elmwood Casino band member Harry Gozzard, mentioned in The Detroit Jewish News that the 50th anniversary of the Elmwood's closure would be occurring later that year. In early December 2024, a collaborative effort to create an event to commemorate the closing was put forth by a few former Elmwood employees. A reunion of some of the employees, including “Mark Brown, the general manager of the Elmwood at the time of its closure” took place on December 21, 2024. The event consisted of a group photo in front of the old Elmwood building and a get-together at the Windsor Sportsmen’s Club.

== Engagements ==
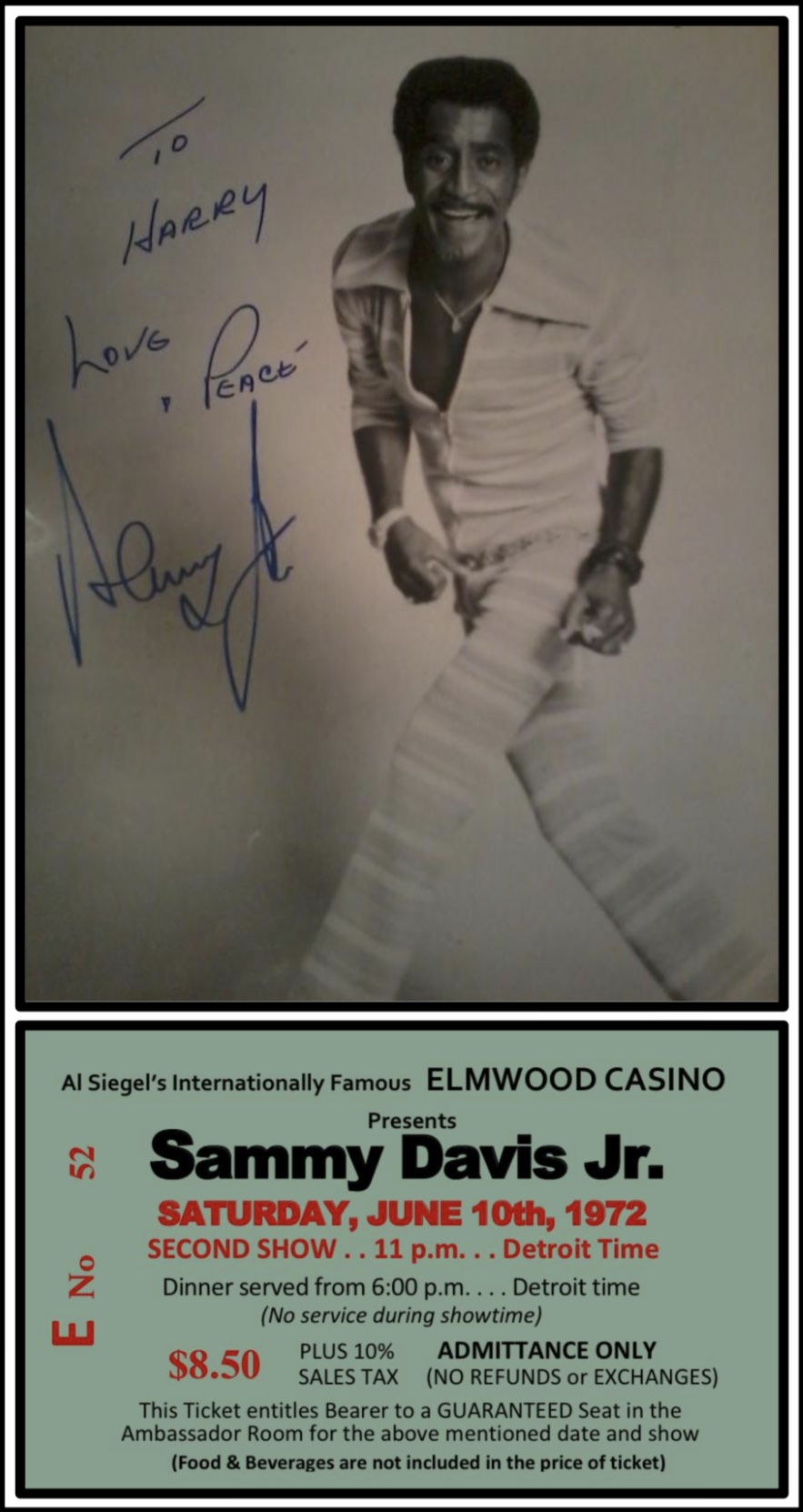
Autographed Sammy Davis Jr. photo given to a member of the Elmwood Casino orchestra. Ticket reproduction of an actual ticket from 1972 show.

Sammy Davis Jr. performed at the Elmwood several times during his career. Whenever he did, he would rent out the entire sixth floor at the historic Gotham Hotel, as was mentioned in Earnest H. Borden's book Detroit’s Paradise Valley. BlackPast mentioned in an article that Davis was on Gotham's guest list of prominent African Americans. The Gotham was known as a safe and upscale hotel for African Americans. The last hit Sammy Davis Jr. ever had was the song Hello Detroit.

Young comedian Bob Newhart's act didn't go over very well during a one-week engagement at the Elmwood. He stated in a Mister Kelly's interview in 2017 that he "never got a laugh." Even though his comedic performances didn't bring the house down, Newhart still managed to speak well of the Elmwood audiences, stating, "They were very polite...Canadians...very nice."

On April 15, 2019, Cher made a surprise appearance on The Tonight Show Starring Jimmy Fallon. Her primary reason for doing so was to promote The Cher Show. Cher credits a three week engagement at Elmwood for turning around her career with Sonny; "the people hated us...I finally got so pissed off I turned around – like sometimes you do – and started to make the band laugh. And the band will laugh at anything." Soon after their Elmwood engagement, they took the new comedic concept to Vegas.

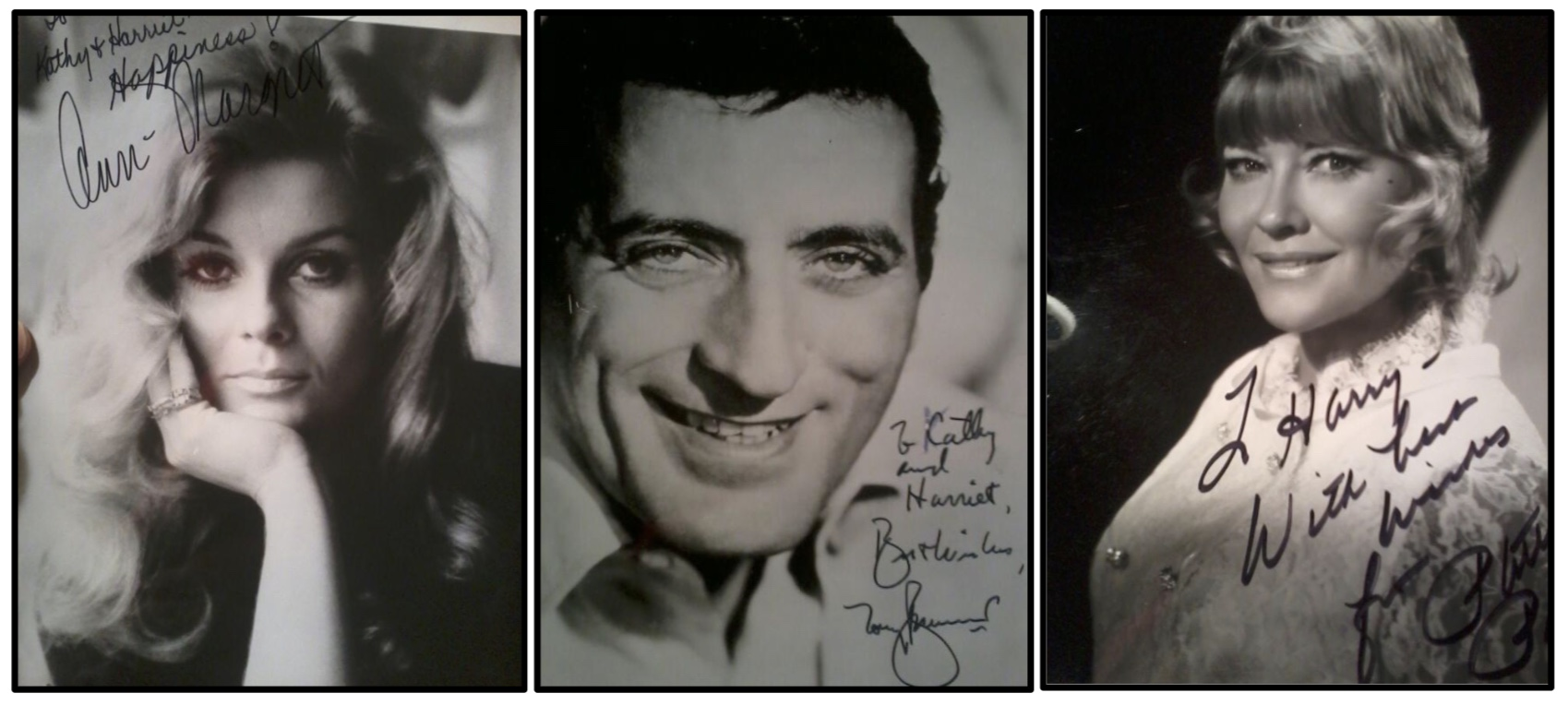
Ann-Margret, Tony Bennett and Patti Page photos given to a member of the Elmwood orchestra

Minsky's Burlesque performed at the Elmwood. A prom in particular that was related to a Minsky’s Burlesque performance at the Elmwood Casino was one that was intended to attend a Sammy Davis Jr. performance. But he had canceled and Minsky’s Burlesque revue performed instead, which was a dramatically different performance than a Sammy Davis Jr. one.

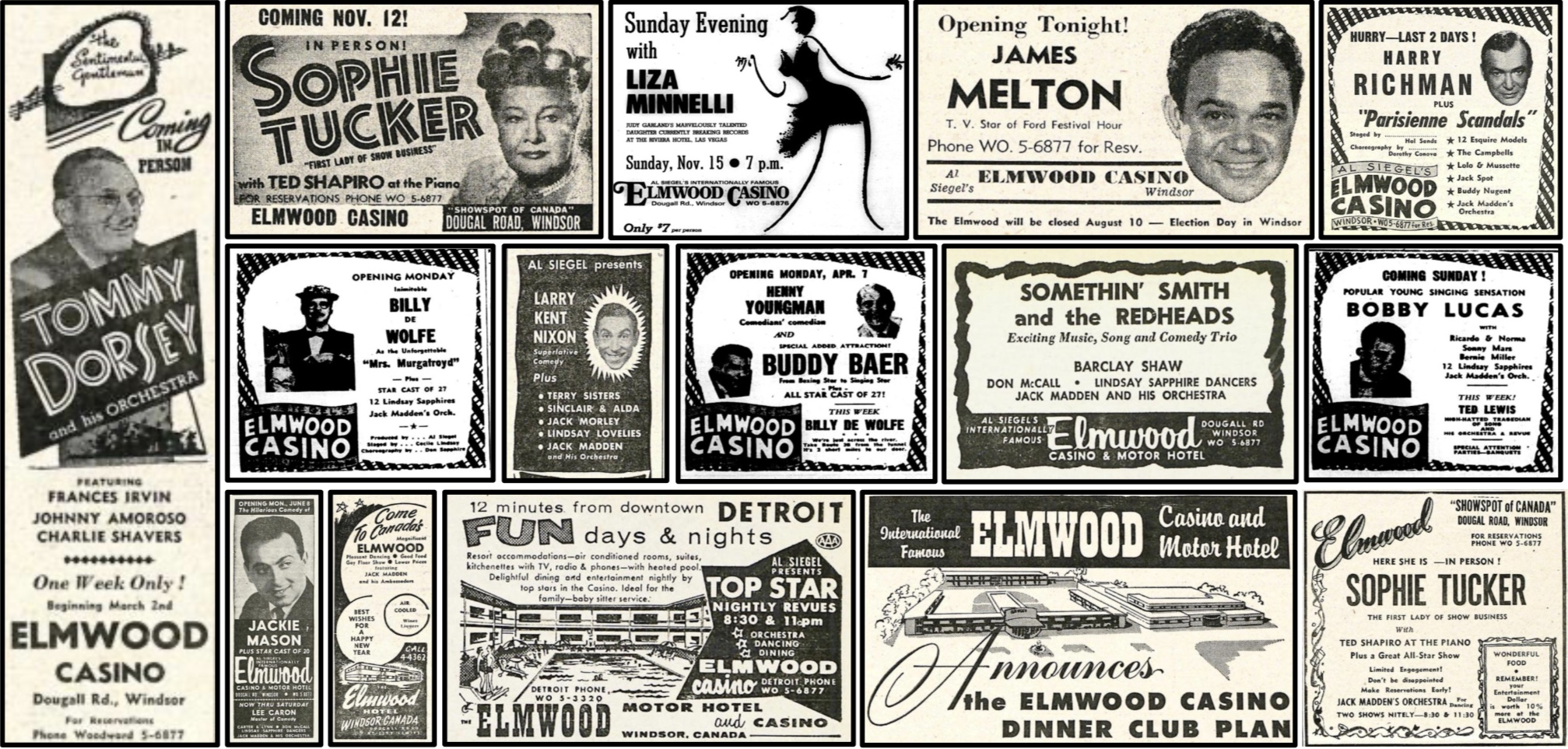
Elmwood newspaper advertisements

The Lindsey-Sapphire Dancers were the in-house dancers at the Elmwood. They, along with comic magician Don Allen, were substitute performers for Diahann Carroll when she was unable to fulfill her July 1967 engagement obligation because of the chaotic conditions that existed in the city of Detroit during the Detroit riot. Carroll was rescheduled to perform at a later date.

== Notable performers ==
As an example of what performers were paid at the Elmwood, Olsen and Johnson received $10,000 per week during their engagement in 1952. That’s equivalent to approximately $115,000 in 2024. Tom Jones, one of the final entertainers to perform in the Ambassador Room at the Elmwood, was paid $10,000 per show during his engagement in 1972. There was a $10 cover charge for that show.

Many entertainers who performed at the Elmwood would also make appearances on Detroit-area television. For example, when hosting his show Bill Kennedy's Showtime on CKLW, host Bill Kennedy frequently interviewed stars who were appearing at the Elmwood, and other local entertainment venues, including Liza Minnelli (who visited the studio between her engagements at the Elmwood), Nat King Cole, Clint Eastwood, Debbie Reynolds, Kirk Douglas, Jayne Mansfield, and Harry Belafonte.

Entertainers who performed at the Elmwood.

- Edie Adams
- Joey Adams
- Johnny Amoroso
- Paul Anka
- Louis Armstrong
- Frankie Avalon
- Buddy Baer
- Jim Bailey
- The Barry Sisters
- Count Basie
- Shirley Bassey
- Tony Bennett
- Edgar Bergen
- Milton Berle
- Shelley Berman
- Joey Bishop
- Victor Borge
- Carl Brisson
- Julie Budd
- Sid Caesar
- Charlie Callas
- Cab Calloway
- Glen Campbell
- The Carpenters
- Diahann Carroll
- Jack Carter
- Carol Channing
- The Chantones
- Ray Charles
- John Ciampa
- Xavier Cugat
- Vic Damone
- Billy Daniels
- Bobby Darin
- Darvas and Julia
- Sammy Davis Jr.
- Yvonne DeCarlo
- Billy DeWolfe
- Phyllis Diller
- Tommy Dorsey
- Ronnie Dove
- Jimmy Durante
- Billy Eckstine
- Nelson Eddy
- Arthur Ellen
- Duke Ellington
- Totie Fields
- Eddie Fisher
- Ella Fitzgerald
- Phil Foster
- Connie Francis
- The Four Freshmen
- Redd Foxx
- John Gary
- Arthur Godfrey
- The Golddiggers
- Frank Gorshin
- Earl Grant
- Buddy Greco
- The Guess Who
- Buddy Hackett
- Juanita Hall
- Harmonicats
- Hildegarde
- Lena Horne
- Robert Horton
- Engelbert Humperdinck
- Frances Irvin
- Eddie Jackson
- George Jessel
- Jack Jones
- Tom Jones
- Beatrice Kay
- Jackie Kannon
- Lainie Kazan
- Jane Kean
- Sonny King
- George Kirby
- Eartha Kitt
- Frankie Laine
- Frances Langford
- The Laurie Sisters
- Lecuona Cuban Boys
- Brenda Lee
- Gypsy Rose Lee
- Peggy Lee
- Jerry Lester
- Buddy Lester
- Sam Levenson
- Joe E. Lewis
- Robert Q. Lewis
- Ted Lewis
- Liberace
- Frank Libuse
- Dorothy Loudon
- Will Mahoney
- Ann-Margret
- Marion Marlowe
- Al Martino
- Jackie Mason
- Marilyn Maye
- The McGuire Sisters
- Barbara McNair
- James Melton
- Olivette Miller
- Roger Miller
- The New Christy Minstrels
- Jan Murray
- Mills Brothers
- Liza Minnelli
- Jane Morgan
- Wayne Newton
- Pat O'Brien
- Olsen & Johnson
- Patti Page
- Janis Paige
- Tony Pastor
- Eddie Peabody
- Lou Rawls
- Del Ray
- Martha Raye
- Harry Richman
- Nipsey Russell
- Mickey Rooney
- Ted Shapiro
- Charlie Shavers
- Dick Shawn
- Dorothy Shay
- Allan Sherman
- Roberta Sherwood
- Dinah Shore
- Sammy Shore
- Phil Silvers
- Frank Sinatra
- O. C. Smith
- Somethin' Smith and the Redheads
- Sonny and Cher
- Ink Spots
- The Supremes
- Kay Starr
- Larry Storch
- Barbra Streisand
- Enzo Stuarti
- The Three Suns
- Tiny Tim
- The Treniers
- Sophie Tucker
- The Four Vagabonds
- Jerry Vale
- Rudy Vallée
- Frankie Valli
- Shani Wallis
- Nancy Wilson
- Frankie Yankovic
- Henny Youngman

== Jack Madden’s Ambassadors ==
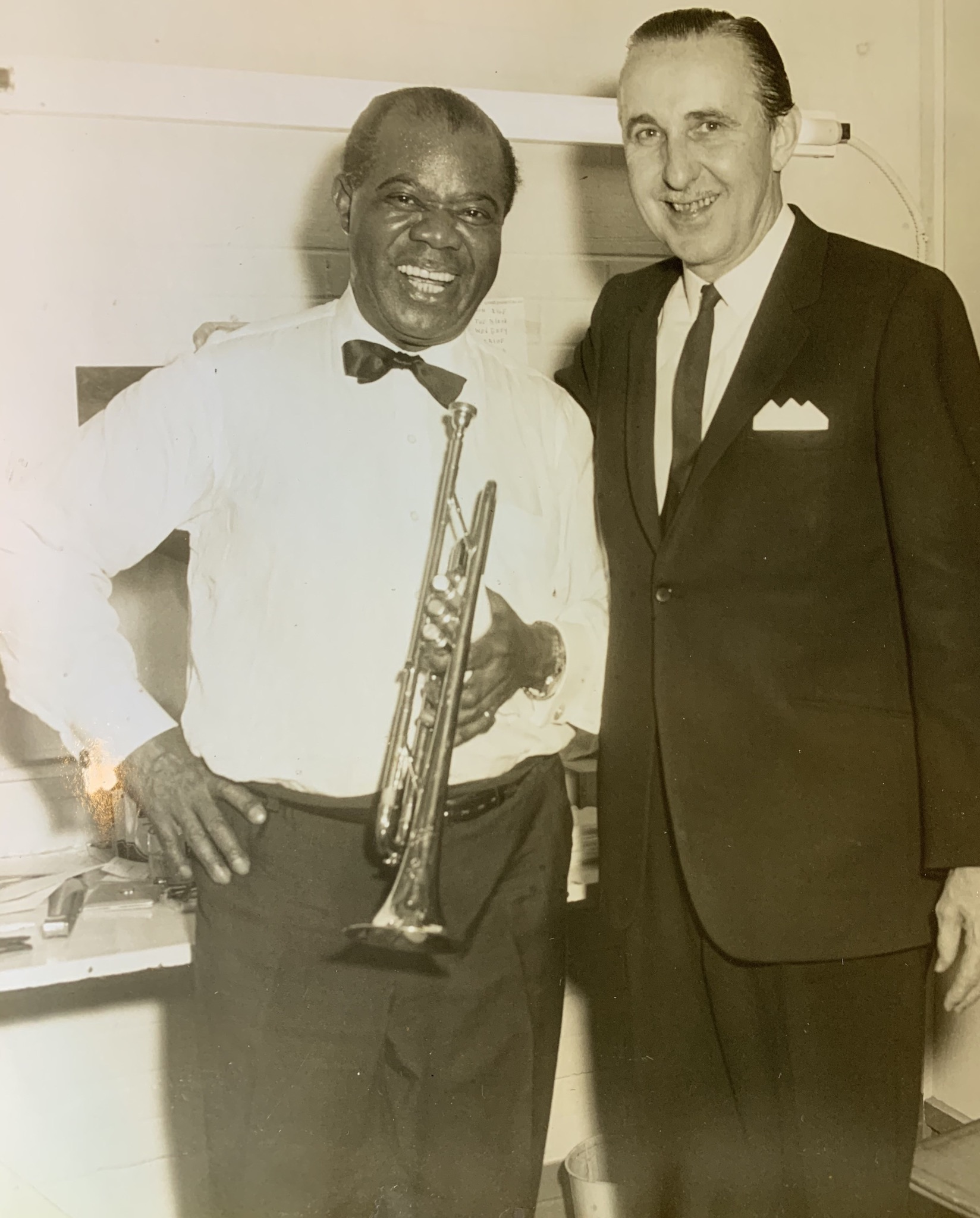
Louis Armstrong with Elmwood band leader Jack Madden, 1950s

Music for dancing and accompaniment for some of the performers at the Elmwood was supplied by The Ambassadors, the in-house orchestra that was led by the orchestra leader Jack Madden. After the headliners finished their performances, Madden and his band would play dance music for the patrons. The final tune of the evening was Sweet and Lovely.

During his four years of service in the Canadian army (World War II), Madden wrote, produced and directed Fun Fatigues. The show was presented to 200,000 Canadian troops stationed in France, The Netherlands, Belgium and Germany. In addition to entertaining troops overseas during the war, Madden’s band also played at army bases across Canada. When the war ended he created his own orchestra. Madden, originally from Toronto, married his wife Phyllis and moved to Windsor also after the war was over. He arrived in the Windsor area in 1935 with Rex Battle’s All Canadian Dance Band which was booked on Bob-Lo Island.

In 1938 Madden replaced Glenn Miller in the Ray Noble band when Miller left to start his own. Madden has also performed with Andre Kostelanetz, Paul Whiteman, Luigi Romanelli and Percy Faith. During the summer of 1947, Madden performed at Chateau Lake Louise. Madden died in September 1990, at 77 years of age.

Ed Nuccilli was the Elmwood’s orchestra leader from 1972 to 1974.

== Al Siegel ==
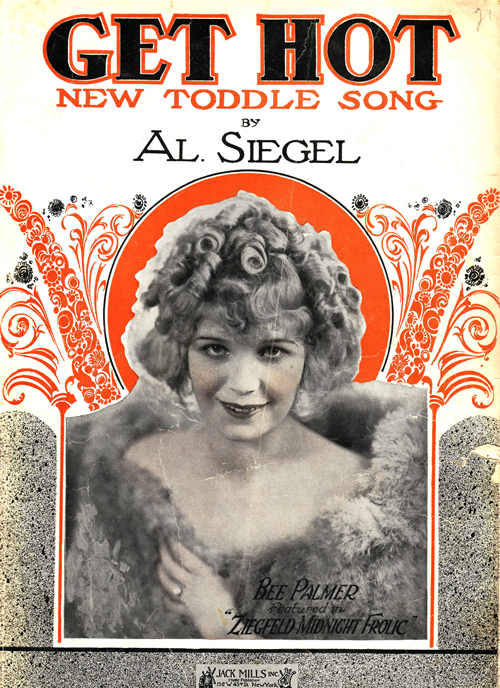
Siegel was married to Bee Palmer

Al Siegel, owner of the Elmwood and cofounder of the now-defunct Windsor Raceway, was a pianist for Bee Palmer during the 1920s. They were married on March 3, 1921, in Davenport, Iowa, while Palmer was on a Vaudeville tour in the Midwest. The secret ceremony took place "at a judge’s office in the local Masonic Temple." Palmer was a singer and dancer who was sometimes credited as the creator of the shimmy dance.

In October 1921, Siegel filed a $250,000 lawsuit against Jack Dempsey, the world heavyweight boxing champion from 1919 to 1926. Siegel claimed that Dempsey lured Palmer away while she was with Dempsey on the Orpheum Circuit. Dempsey denied the accusation. Palmer and Siegel separated for a time over this controversy. They later made up in February 1922. The lawsuit was eventually dropped after their short separation. Palmer later divorced Siegel in 1928. He soon afterward got involved with Ethel Merman. Siegel was "her coach and accompanist."

Siegel was in the Ziegfeld Follies of 1927 as a performer. He was in the ensemble in Here’s Howe. He was also in the ensemble in Happy Go Lucky. Siegel was a part of at least three recordings in 1924. He played the piano during the making of those records.
