= In the West =

Studio album by Silkworm
- Released: 1994
- Genre: Indie rock
- Length: 43:54
- Label: C/Z Records; Comedy Minus One
- Producer: Steve Albini

Silkworm chronology
L'ajre! (1992)	In the West (1994)	Libertine (1994)

Professional ratings
Review scores
Source	Rating
AllMusic	3.5/5 stars
The Encyclopedia of Popular Music	3/5 stars
Pitchfork	8.1/10
Tom Hull – on the Web	B+

In the West is the second full-length album by indie rock band Silkworm, released in 1994. It was the band's first full-length album to be produced by their long-time friend Steve Albini; the first official recording that the band recorded with him was the His Absence Is A Blessing EP.

In March 2019, Comedy Minus One announced they would be pressing In The West on vinyl for the first time to celebrate the album's 25th anniversary. The reissue was released in January 2020.

== Critical reception ==
Trouser Press wrote "the exquisitely spacious album's deep rhythmic caverns invite and demand casual lingering."

== Track listing ==
1. "Garden City Blues" - 4:13
2. "Dust My Broom" - 2:40
3. "Into the Woods" - 3:28
4. "Punch Drunk Five" - 2:48
5. "Raised by Tigers" - 5:15
6. "Enough Is Enough" - 8:13
7. "Parsons" - 3:45
8. "Incanduce" - 3:26
9. "Dremate" - 5:48
10. "Pilot" - 4:18

== Personnel ==
- Andy Cohen – guitar, vocals; lead vocals on tracks 2, 3, 7
- Joel RL Phelps – guitar, vocals; lead vocals on tracks 5, 9, 10
- Tim Midyett – bass, vocals; lead vocals on tracks 1, 4, 6, 8
- Michael Dahlquist – drums, vocals
- Steve Albini – engineer
