= Libertine (Silkworm album) =

Studio album by Silkworm
- Released: 1994
- Recorded: May 17–20, 1994
- Genre: Indie rock
- Length: 46:04
- Labels: El Recordo, Comedy Minus One
- Producer: Steve Albini

Silkworm chronology
In The West (1994)	Libertine (1994)	Firewater (1996)

Professional ratings
Review scores
Source	Rating
AllMusic	4/5 stars
Alternative Rock	9/10
The Encyclopedia of Popular Music	4/5 stars
The Great Indie Discography	7/10
The Line of Best Fit	9/10
MusicHound Rock: The Essential Album Guide	3/5 stars
Pitchfork	7.0/10
Popmatters	6/10

Libertine is the third full-length studio album by indie rock band Silkworm. It was released in 1994 on El Recordo. It was their last recorded release before guitarist/vocalist Joel RL Phelps left the band.

A remastered and expanded 2x12" + CD reissue of the record, including the group's Marco Collins Sessions EP and two additional tracks, was issued by Comedy Minus One in May 2014.

== Production ==
The album was recorded over three days with Steve Albini.

== Critical reception ==
Trouser Press wrote that "although it still emphasizes snap and crackle over pop, Libertine is slightly more immediate than its predecessors." Magnet called "Couldn't You Wait?" a "lost classic" of the era; the track provided the title to the 2013 documentary film about the band. Paste called the album "a favorite with Silkworm afficionados," writing that the album is "strong" but that the "grunge-fallout muddiness sounds dated."

== Track listing ==
No.	Title	Length
1.	"There Is a Party in Warsaw Tonight"	4:04
2.	"Grotto of Miracles"	4:48
3.	"Cotton Girl"	3:08
4.	"Yen + Janet Forever"	5:59
5.	"Oh How We Laughed"	2:55
6.	"The Cigarette Lighters"	5:44
7.	"Couldn't You Wait?"	3:45
8.	"A Tunnel"	5:10
9.	"Written on the Wind"	4:27
10.	"Wild in My Day"	5:33
11.	"Bloody Eyes"	3:31

== Personnel ==
- Steve Albini—Engineer
- Andy Cohen—Guitar, Vocals on 1 & 2
- Joel RL Phelps—Guitar, Vocals on 4, 5, 6, & 8
- Michael Dahlquist—Drums
- Tim Midyett—Bass, Vocals on 3, 7, 9, 10, & 11
