= Jon Solomon =

American radio DJ

Jon Solomon (born April 19, 1973) is an American radio DJ. He has been the host of "Jon Solomon's Annual 25-Hour Holiday Radio Show" at WPRB in Princeton, New Jersey, since 1988, when he was fifteen years old.

Solomon's weekly three-hour radio program broadcasts on Wednesdays on WPRB. Each week's show features a live performance, and more than 200 bands have appeared on this show since 2001. Philebrity called Solomon "the closest thing the Philly indie rock scene has to a John Peel".

Solomon lives in the Lawrenceville section of Lawrence Township, Mercer County, New Jersey.

== Record labels ==
One of Solomon's record labels, My Pal God Records, put out recordings by A Minor Forest, Bitter Bitter Weeks, Del Rey, The Embarrassment, Eyeball Skeleton, Ex Models, The French Kicks, Paul Newman, Silkworm, TW Walsh, Joel R.L. Phelps, Dianogah, and Emperor Penguin. Comedy Minus One is Solomon's current record label which has released albums by Bottomless Pit, The Karl Hendricks Trio, Obits, Oxford Collapse, Silkworm, SAVAK and Tre Orsi.

== Other activities ==
Solomon hosted the Philadelphia City Paper podcast "Local Support", a program that featured the music of artists from the Philadelphia metropolitan area, and was the founding editor of the Princeton Basketball News, a web site about the Princeton Tigers men's basketball team.
