= Firewater (Silkworm album) =

Studio album by Silkworm
- Released: February 20, 1996
- Genre: Indie rock
- Length: 59:05
- Label: Matador
- Producer: Steve Albini

Silkworm chronology
Libertine (1994)	Firewater (1996)	Developer (1997)

Professional ratings
Review scores
Source	Rating
AllMusic	4.5/5 stars
Alternative Rock	7/10
Encyclopedia of Popular Music	3/5 stars
The Great Alternative & Indie Discography	6/10
MusicHound Rock	3/5
Spin	8/10

Firewater is the fourth full-length studio album released by indie rock band Silkworm. It was engineered by Steve Albini, who worked on most of the band's albums and singles. The album was recorded and released two years after guitarist/vocalist Joel RL Phelps left the band, leaving the remaining members to record the album as a trio. It was the band's first album released on Matador Records.

On December 4, 2026 Comedy Minus One will issue a remastered and expanded 2xLP + CD edition of Firewater including six bonus tracks.

== Track listing ==
1. "Nerves" - 2:59
2. "Drunk" - 3:05
3. "Wet Firecracker" - 2:03
4. "Slow Hands" - 5:27
5. "Cannibal Cannibal" - 2:41
6. "Tarnished Angel" - 5:08
7. "Quicksand" - 3:11
8. "Ticket Tulane" - 3:31
9. "Swings" - 3:04
10. "Severance Pay" - 3:11
11. "The Lure of Beauty" - 4:05
12. "Miracle Mile" - 4:14
13. "Drag The River" - 3:08
14. "Killing My Ass" - 4:48
15. "Caricature of a Joke" - 3:20
16. "Don't Make Plans This Friday" - 5:20

== Personnel ==
Silkwater

- Andy Cohen — guitar, vocals on 1, 4, 6, 10, 14, 16
- Michael Dahlquist — drums
- Tim Midyett — bass, vocals on 2, 3, 5, 7, 8, 9, 11, 12, 13, 15
- Steve Albini — engineer
