= Italian Platinum =

Studio album by Silkworm
- Released: 2002
- Genre: Indie rock
- Length: 40:28
- Label: Touch and Go Records
- Producer: Steve Albini, Heather Whinna

Silkworm chronology
| Lifestyle (2000) | Italian Platinum (2002) | It'll Be Cool (2004) |

Professional ratings
Aggregate scores
| Source | Rating |
|---|---|
| Metacritic | 79/100 |
Review scores
| Source | Rating |
| AllMusic | 3/5 stars |
| Alternative Press | 4.5/5 |
| Blender | 3/5 stars |
| Now | 3/5 |
| Ox-Fanzine | 7/10 |
| Pitchfork | 7.9/10 |
| Spin | 7/10 |
| The Village Voice | A− |
| Tom Hull - on the Web | B+ |

Italian Platinum is the eighth full-length album released by American indie rock band Silkworm. It is the band's third album released on Touch and Go Records. Like their previous album Lifestyle, Steve Albini and his girlfriend Heather Whinna recorded and produced the album respectively. Matt Kadane from Bedhead and The New Year played keyboards on this album.

== Track listing ==
1. "(I Hope U) Don't Survive" – (3:25)
2. "The Third" – (2:09)
3. "The Old You" – (3:22)
4. "Is She a Sign" – (2:28)
5. "The Brain" – (2:59)
6. "Bourbon Beard" – (3:13)
7. "LR72" – (4:12)
8. "White Lightning" – (3:20)
9. "Dirty Air" – (2:41)
10. "Young" – (3:27)
11. "Moving" – (2:52)
12. "The Ram" – (2:43)
13. "A Cockfight of Feelings" – (3:37)

== Personnel ==
- Andy Cohen—Guitar, Vocals
- Michael Dahlquist—Drums, Vocals
- Tim Midyett—Bass, Baritone Guitar, Vocals
- Matt Kadane—Keyboards
- Steve Albini—Engineer
- Heather Whinna—Producer
- Kelly Hogan—Backing Vocals, Lead vocals on "Young"
- Nick Webb—Mastering
