= Del Ray =

Del Ray may refer to:

- Jimmy Del Ray (1962–2014), American professional wrestler
- Del Ray (magician) (c. 1927–2003), American magician
- Del Ray, a neighborhood in Alexandria, Virginia
- A common misspelling for Del Rey
- A brand of drums made by Teisco
- Glasco, Kansas, a town in Kansas

== See also ==
- Delray (disambiguation)
- Del Rey (disambiguation)
