= Delray =

Delray is the name of several communities in the United States of America:

- Delray, Georgia
- Delray, Detroit, Michigan
- Delray, Texas
- Delray, West Virginia
- Delray Beach, Florida
- Delray Gardens, Florida
- Delray Shores, Florida

See also

- Battle of Molino del Rey, inspiration for the name Delray of Detroit, in turn inspiration for the name Delray Beach, Florida
- Del Ray (disambiguation)
- Del Rey (disambiguation)
- Chevrolet Delray
