= Blueblood (album) =

Studio album by Silkworm
- Released: 1998
- Genre: Indie rock
- Length: 34:36
- Label: Touch and Go

Silkworm chronology
Developer (1997)	Blueblood (1998)	Lifestyle (2000)

Professional ratings
Review scores
Source	Rating
AllMusic	3.5/5 stars
The Encyclopedia of Popular Music	3/5 stars
Pitchfork	2.5/10

Blueblood is the sixth full-length studio album by indie rock band Silkworm, released in 1998. Unlike other Silkworm releases, it was not recorded by their long-time engineer Steve Albini, though he is credited with mixing the record (he would record the band on their next album, Lifestyle). It is the band's first album released on Touch and Go Records.

== Critical reception ==
The Chicago Reader called the album "disappointingly flat and half-baked." Salon wrote that "[Tim] Midgett sings ragged and artless in the accepted indie style, but an endearing half-resigned, half-yearning melancholy is all he needs to put the wry words across." CMJ New Music Monthly called Blueblood "a stimulating mix of riff-fueled rants and more meandering tunes."

== Track listing ==
1. Eff -- (3:46)
2. I Must Prepare (Tablecloth Tint) -- (2:47)
3. Said It Too Late -- (2:44)
4. Redeye -- (2:11)
5. Empty Elevator Shaft -- (3:41)
6. Beyond Repair -- (5:21)
7. Tonight We're Meat -- (4:34)
8. Ritz Dance -- (4:09)
9. Pearly Gates -- (2:36)
10. Clean'd Me Out -- (2:47)

== Personnel ==
- Andy Cohen—Guitar, Vocals
- Michael Dahlquist—Drums, Vocals
- Tim Midyett—Bass, Baritone Guitar, Vocals
- Brett Gossman—Keyboards
