= Hammer of the Gods =

Hammer of the Gods may refer to:

== Film and television ==
- Hammer of the Gods, a 2009 American television film starring Zachery Ty Bryan
- Hammer of the Gods (2013 film), a British action film
- "Hammer of the Gods" (Supernatural), a 2010 TV episode

== Music ==
- Hammer of the Gods (album), by Bottomless Pit, 2007
- "Hammer of the Gods", a song by Saxon from Call to Arms, 2011
- "Hammer of the Gods", an instrumental by Testament from The Gathering, 2008 reissue

== Other uses ==
- Hammer of the Gods (book), a 1985 book by Stephen Davis about the rock band Led Zeppelin
- Hammer of the Gods (video game), a 1994 strategy computer game

== See also ==
- The Hammer of God (disambiguation)
- Mjölnir, Thor's hammer
