= Lifestyle (album) =

Studio album by Silkworm
- Released: August 8, 2000
- Genre: Indie rock
- Length: 36:58
- Label: Touch and Go
- Producer: Steve Albini

Silkworm chronology
Blueblood (1998)	Lifestyle (2000)	Italian Platinum (2002)

Professional ratings
Review scores
Source	Rating
AllMusic	3.5/5 stars
Robert Christgau	A−
Daily Herald	3.5/4 stars
The Encyclopedia of Popular Music	3/5 stars
Tom Hull	A−
Pittsburgh Post-Gazette	3/4 stars

Lifestyle is the seventh studio album by the American indie rock band Silkworm. It was released on August 8, 2000, by Touch and Go Records, their second on the label.

== Production ==
The album was produced by Steve Albini, the band's longtime producer (although he had only mixed Silkworm's previous album).

== Critical reception ==
Exclaim! wrote: "You can dig 'Treat the New Guy Right' and 'YR Web' for being the appropriate ratio of ride in the drums, propagation of the bass, twinkling keys, alternately chiming and grinding guitars, and the worldly wise lyrics." Eric Weisbard, in The Village Voice, wrote: "Silkworm wouldn’t relish the comparison, but Lifestyle reminds me of Pearl Jam’s underappreciated Yield—rock made to honor a band’s sense of their own standards." The Chicago Reader wrote that "Neil Young's slow-burn lyricism is still a big influence--that's especially evident in the wrenching guitar solo that opens 'That's Entertainment'—but these guys have never sounded more comfortable in their own skins." The Star Tribune thought that "Andy Cohen's vocals cast a dry, jaundiced pall as his bandmates dodge in and out with lashing guitars, restless rhythmic forays and solemn marches." The New York Times deemed the album "another batch of clangy, engagingly sulky songs for listeners who like to ponder while they rock."

== Track listing ==
1. Contempt – (2:49)
2. Slave Wages – (3:06)
3. Treat the New Guy Right – (2:42)
4. Plain – (3:54)
5. Roots – (2:55)
6. Yr Web – (3:25)
7. That's Entertainment – (3:45)
8. Raging Bull – (1:41)
9. Around the Outline – (4:00)
10. Dead Air – (2:16)
11. Ooh La La (Ronnie Wood/Ronnie Lane) – (3:56)
12. The Bones – (2:29)

== Personnel ==
- Andy Cohen – guitar, vocals
- Michael Dahlquist – drums, vocals
- Tim Midyett – bass, baritone guitar, vocals
- Brett Gossman – keyboards
- Steve Albini – engineer
- Heather Whinna – producer, backing vocals on 3
- Hiroshi Kimura – artwork
- Steve Rooke – mastering
