= The Karl Hendricks Trio =

American rock band

Karl Hendricks Trio
- Origin: Pittsburgh, Pennsylvania, U.S.
- Genres: Alternative rock, Indie rock
- Years active: 1991–2016
- Labels: Merge, Fire, Comedy Minus One
- Past members: Karl Hendricks; Corey Layman; Jake Leger; Len Jarabeck; Caulen Kress; Noah Leger; Tim Parker; Tom Hoffman; Chris Emerson; Matt Jencik; Alexsey Plotnicov
- Website: www.mergerecords.com/artists/karl

The Karl Hendricks Trio was an American rock band from Pittsburgh, Pennsylvania, United States. In the span of twelve years, they released seven albums, toured, and even played as a four-piece rock band. The band's latest album was 2012's The Adult Section. The most recent line-up included Jake Leger on drums and Corey Layman on bass. Hendricks contributed as singer, songwriter and guitarist.

== Biography ==
The moody, muscular indie-rock band dubbed the Karl Hendricks Trio was formed in 1991 following the break-up of their nominal leader's previous band, Sludgehammer. Hendricks, a singer, guitarist and songwriter was born in Port Vue, near Pittsburgh, Pennsylvania in 1970 and first began writing songs and releasing cassettes while in his teens. While working at his day job in a record store, he formed the Trio with bassist Tim Parker and drummer Tom Hoffman. The band played their first show on New Year's Eve 1991 and recorded their first album a couple of weeks later. Released on LP on his own label, Grass Records, 1992's Buick Electra garnered national attention and sold out quickly.

The Trio recorded two albums worth of material during the later months of 1992, and early in 1993, the mini-album Some Girls Like Cigarettes was released as a 10". A few months later, Misery and Women was released and the band toured for the first time.

In 1994, Buick Electra was reissued on CD. The Trio's next new album was 1995's A Gesture of Kindness, the first recorded by Brian Paulson, who would also work on the band's next two albums. A Gesture of Kindness was also the last one to feature the original rhythm section of Hoffman and Parker.

Later in 1995, Merge Records reissued Some Girls Like Cigarettes on CD. Len Jarabeck joined on bass and the band recorded their first completely new album for Merge, 1996's For a While, It Was Funny. The next album was 1998's Declare Your Weapons, the first to feature Kress on bass. Noah Leger also replaced Hoffman on drums.

From later in 1998 to 2000, the band expanded to a quartet (now dubbed the "Karl Hendricks Rock Band") with Matt Jencik on second guitar and Chris Emerson on drums. This version of the band, except for one single, did not do much recording. In 2001, the band returned to a trio, with Jake Leger taking over on drums. In 2002, the band started recording their next album for Merge, The Jerks Win Again.

The band did a cross-country tour in 2003 in support of The Jerks Win Again. After the tour, Kress quit to pursue other things. In 2004, Len Jarabeck returned to the bass slot. Also, A Gesture of Kindness, long out of print, was re-issued on CD by Spirit of Orr. Hendricks continued writing new songs and the band recorded the follow-up to The Jerks Win Again in 2006. The World Says was released in 2007.

The Karl Hendricks Trio released their album, The Adult Section, via the Comedy Minus One label on July 17, 2012.

The band's sound and approach changed over the years. The early years presented a fervently confessional side of Hendricks, and the youthful heartbreak in the lyrics was embodied in the band's spirited performances. In later years, Hendricks' lyrics became more outward-looking and his guitar playing became more expansive.

Although relative strangers to the road at times, the Karl Hendricks Trio toured significantly. Among the bands they've toured with are Neutral Milk Hotel, Superchunk, Smog, Low, My Dad Is Dead, Butterglory, Kind of Like Spitting and Small 23. They've also played shows with, among others, Silkworm, Don Caballero, The Mekons, The Spinanes, The Shipping News, New Bomb Turks, Labradford, Hayden, Joel R.L. Phelps, Magic Hour, Hurl, Steve Earle, and Bottomless Pit.

Karl Hendricks also served as a bass player in The Speaking Canaries and Developer.

Karl Hendricks died on January 21, 2017, at the age of 46. His death effectively ended the Karl Hendricks Trio project.

== Discography ==
- Buick Electra (Peas Kor, 1992; reissued by Grass, 1994)
- Some Girls Like Cigarettes (Big Ten Rex, 1993; reissued by Merge, 1995)
- Misery and Women (Fiasco, 1993)
- A Gesture of Kindness (Fiasco/Peas Kor, 1995; reissued by Spirit of Orr, 2004)
- For a While, It Was Funny (Merge, 1996)
- Declare Your Weapons (Merge, 1998)
- The Jerks Win Again (Merge, 2003)
- The World Says (as The Karl Hendricks Rock Band) (Comedy Minus One, 2007)
- The Adult Section (Comedy Minus One, 2012)

== Band members ==
=== Former ===
- Karl Hendricks (voice, guitar; died 2017)
- Corey Layman (bass)
- Jake Leger (drums)
- Len Jarabeck (bass)
- Caulen Kress (bass)
- Noah Leger (drums)
- Tim Parker (bass)
- Tom Hoffman (drums)
- Chris Emerson (drums)
- Matt Jencik (guitar)
- Alexsey Plotnicov (guitar)
