= It'll Be Cool =

Studio album by Silkworm
- Released: 2004
- Genre: Indie rock
- Length: 36:23
- Label: Touch and Go Records
- Producer: Steve Albini

Silkworm chronology
Italian Platinum (2002)	It'll Be Cool (2004)

Professional ratings
Aggregate scores
Source	Rating
Metacritic	70/100
Review scores
Source	Rating
AllMusic	3/5 stars
Robert Christgau	(2-star Honorable Mention)
Pitchfork	7.1/10

It'll Be Cool is the ninth and final studio album released by indie rock band Silkworm before drummer Michael Dahlquist was killed in a car wreck. Released on September 14, 2004, it was the band's fourth album on Touch and Go Records. The album was recorded by Steve Albini. Matt Kadane from Bedhead and The New Year played keyboards on the album.

== Track listing ==
1. Don't Look Back -- (6:25)
2. Insomnia -- (5:35)
3. Penalty Box -- (3:02)
4. Something Hyper -- (4:27)
5. Xian Undertaker -- (6:17)
6. Shitty Little Yacht -- (4:46)
7. The Operative -- (3:23)
8. His Mark Replies -- (2:28)

== Personnel ==
- Andy Cohen—Guitar, Vocals
- Michael Dahlquist—Drums, Vocals, Guitar
- Tim Midyett—Bass, Baritone Guitar, Vocals
- Matt Kadane—Keyboards
- Steve Albini—Engineer
- J.J. Golden—Mastering
