= Thrilladelphia Music Festival =

Music festival in Philadelphia, USA

The Thrilladelphia Music Festival is an American music festival in Philadelphia, Pennsylvania. In 2006, it ran from April 21 to April 29.

The first Thrilladelphia festival was 2004. The theme is indie rock and largely Philadelphia-area bands.

== 2006 lineup ==
=== April 22 ===
American Altitude, Jake the Flying Rake's Nitrogen Band, Sam Champion, Cordalene

=== April 26 ===
At the Khyber: Dragon City, Pattern is Movement, The Metrosexuals, Voodoo Economics, The Sky Drops
At the M Room: Creeping Weeds, Walker Lundee, Surefire Broadcast, The Superultras

=== April 27 ===
At the M Room: Sw!ms, Okay Paddy, The Green Chair, New Motels
At the Khyber: Future Tips, This Radiant Boy, Metroplex, Rarebirds

=== April 28 ===
At the First Unitarian Church: Lilys, Apollo Sunshine, Bitter Bitter Weeks, Levy
At the North Star: Capitol Years, The Situation, Thee Minks, Jake Brennan and the Confidence Men, Robert Skoro, Saxon Shore
At the M Room: Golden Ball, Mike Tamburo, Chris Bozzone, Niagara Falls
At the Kyber: The Swimmers, Grammar Debate!, Persona, Illumina

=== April 29 ===
N. Hancock St. Block Party: Blood Feathers, Hi Soft, surprise guest
At the Khyber: Bardo Pond, The Elevator Parade, Major Stars, Paper Napkin
At the M Room: Yah Mos Def, ArTanker Convoy, Late Night Television, Eyeball Skeleton
At Tritone: Phil Moore Browne, Coyote, Bottom of the Hudson, Mountain High
