= Al Siegel =

- Al Siegel, circa 1960

Background information
- Born: circa 1899
- Origin: New York City, New York, United States
- Died: July 25, 1981
- Genres: Jazz
- Occupations: Musician, businessman
- Instrument: Piano

Al Siegel was a Canadian musician and businessman. He owned the Elmwood Casino, Windsor Raceway and the Blue Room in Toronto. Siegel was also the owner of a Canadian jukebox business.

== Career ==
=== Bee Palmer ===
Siegel was a pianist for Bee Palmer during the 1920s. They were married on March 3, 1921, in Davenport, Iowa while Palmer was on a Vaudeville tour in the Midwest. The secret ceremony took place "at a judge’s office in the local Masonic Temple." Palmer was a singer and dancer who was sometimes credited as the creator of the shimmy dance.

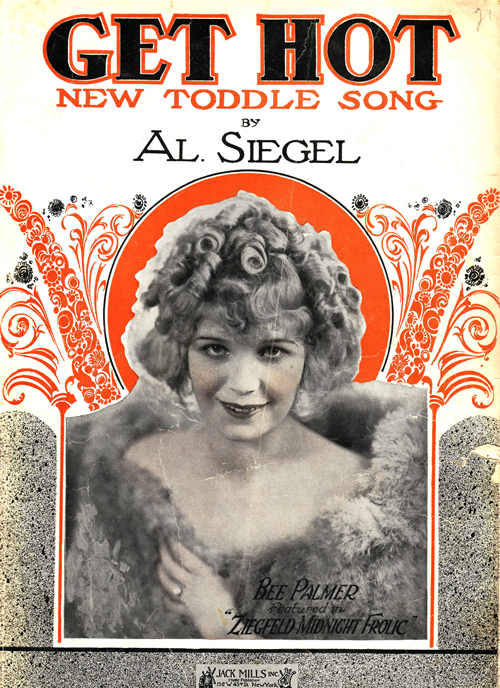
Siegel was Bee Palmer’s pianist and husband

In October 1921, Siegel filed a $250,000 lawsuit against Jack Dempsey, the world heavyweight boxing champion from 1919 to 1926. Siegel claimed that Dempsey lured Palmer away from him while she was with Dempsey on the Orpheum Circuit. Dempsey denied the accusation. Palmer and Siegel separated for a time because of the controversy. They later made up in February 1922. The lawsuit was eventually dropped after their short separation. Siegel, with Palmer, performed at different venues around Chicago, including the Sherman House Hotel, Granada Theatre and Marbro Theatre. Palmer later divorced Siegel in 1928. He soon afterward got involved with Ethel Merman. Siegel was "her coach and accompanist." The complicated and difficult romance of Siegel and Palmer was almost turned into a movie. Even though screenwriter Leo Katcher completed the script for the film, production efforts ceased for some reason.

Siegel was in the Ziegfeld Follies of 1927 as a performer. He was in the ensemble in Here’s Howe. He was also in the ensemble in Happy Go Lucky. Siegel was a part of at least three recordings in 1924. He played the piano during the making of those records.

=== Ethel Merman ===
One of Siegel’s major career accomplishments, as a musician, involved Ethel Merman and the role that she played in the George Gershwin and Ira Gershwin musical, Girl Crazy, held at the Alvin Theatre in 1930-31. It was Merman’s debut Broadway performance. Her powerful voice and overwhelming presence on stage delighted the audience. Siegel helped her during her rehearsals for the production. He was also supposed to be the onstage pianist for the opening night performance, but became ill and was replaced by the pit pianist Roger Edens. Siegel got billing and credit for the production. He also did all of Merman’s vocal arrangements, including I Got Rhythm.

Siegel, Merman’s “shady pianist-manager,” helped her develop her unique style by helping her choose “better material” and by arranging it for her in an exciting way. Before Siegel came along, her amazing voice was the only thing that made her unique. Siegel later did claim that Merman became a star because of him, a claim that she denied. Ethel Merman performed at Al Siegel’s Elmwood Casino several years after they parted ways in the early 1930s.

=== Elmwood Casino ===
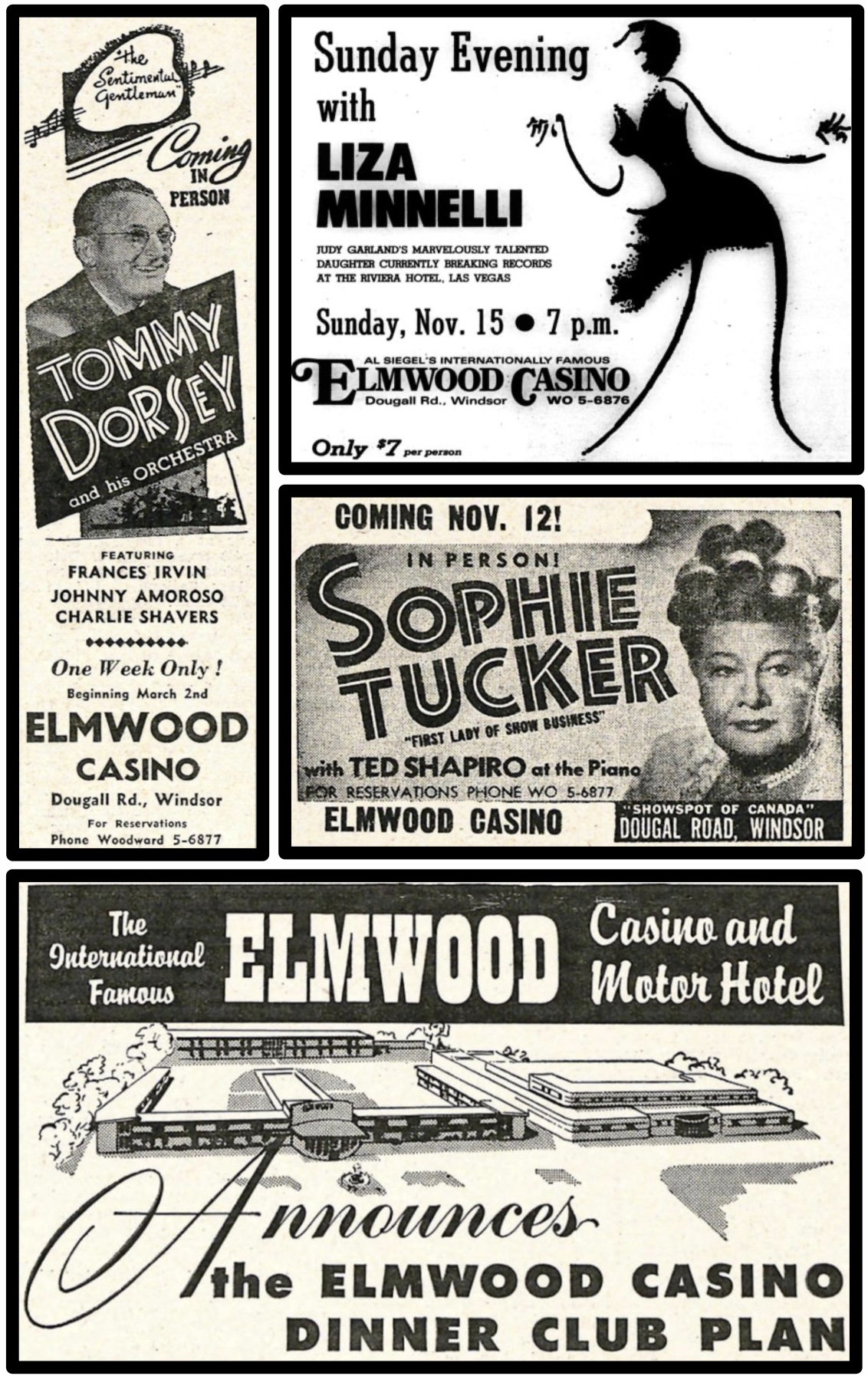
Many top entertainers performed at the Elmwood

Siegel opened the Elmwood Casino in 1946. During its heyday, it was known as the “Showspot of Canada.” Danny Raskin stated in an article in The Detroit Jewish News that the Elmwood “was considered a major stomping ground for show biz greats. If you didn't play Al Siegel’s Elmwood Casino, you hadn't hit the big time yet.”

Siegel played sort of an encouraging role during the early days of Bob Newhart’s career. Newhart stated in the first chapter of his book, I Shouldn't Even Be Doing This!: And Other Things That Strike Me as Funny, that he “tanked onstage” during his one-week engagement at Siegel’s Elmwood Casino. At the end of the fifth performance, “when [Newhart] was feeling totally deflated,” Siegel approached him backstage. “He patted me on the back,” stated Newhart. Siegel then invited him to perform sometime at his Blue Room nightclub in Toronto. Newhart, stammering, thanked Siegel. In David Steinberg’s book, Inside Comedy, Newhart stated that poor performance at the Elmwood “‘almost drove me back to accounting.’”

The Elmwood was opened for almost 30 years. Due to financial problems, Siegel voluntarily filed for bankruptcy and closed the nightclub in December 1974.

Siegel died July 25, 1981, in Laguna Beach, California. He was 82 years old.
