= Michigan International Speedway =

Motorsport track in the United States

- D-shaped Oval (1968–present)
- Location: 12626 U.S. Highway 12; Cambridge Township, Michigan, U.S.
- Coordinates: 42°03′59″N 84°14′29″W
- Capacity: 56,000
- Owner: NASCAR (November 2019–present)
- Broke ground: September 27, 1967; 59 years ago
- Opened: October 13, 1968; 58 years ago
- Construction cost: US$4.5 million
- Former names: Michigan Speedway (1997–2000)
- Major events: Current: NASCAR Cup Series; FireKeepers Casino 400 (1969–1972, 1974–present); Consumers Energy 400 (1969–2020); NASCAR Truck Series; DQS Solutions & Staffing 250 (1999–2000, 2002–2020, 2025–present); Former: NASCAR Xfinity Series; Cabo Wabo 250 (1992–2019, 2021–2024); IRL/IndyCar; Michigan Indy 400 (2002–2007); CART; Michigan 500 (1979–2001); U.S. 500 (1996); USAC (1968, 1970–1978); IMSA GT Championship (1984); Trans-Am Series (1969, 1971); Can-Am (1969)
- Website: mispeedway.com

D-shaped Oval (1968–present)
- Length: 2.000 mi (3.219 km)
- Banking: Turns: 18° Frontstretch: 12° Backstretch: 5°
- Race lap record: 0:30.767 ( (Mexico) Adrián Fernández, Lola T96/00, 1996, CART)

Infield Road Course (1968–present)
- Length: 1.900 mi (3.058 km)
- Race lap record: 1:06.060 ( (United States) Bill Whittington, March 84G, 1984, IMSA GTP)

Extended Road Course (1968–1994)
- Length: 3.310 mi (5.327 km)
- Race lap record: 1:36.100 ( (New Zealand) Denny Hulme, McLaren M8B, 1969, Can-Am)

Michigan International Speedway (formerly named as the Michigan Speedway from 1997 to 2000) is a 2.000 mi (3.219 km) D-shaped oval superspeedway in Cambridge Township, Michigan, United States, just south of the village of Brooklyn. It has hosted various major auto racing series throughout its existence, including NASCAR, CART, and IndyCar races. The speedway has a capacity of 56,000 as of 2021. Along with the main track, the facility also features three road course layouts of varying lengths designed by British racing driver Stirling Moss, which utilizes parts of the oval, parts located within track's infield, and parts located outside of the track's confines. The facility is owned by NASCAR and is led by track president Joe Fowler.

In the 1960s, Windsor Raceway owner Lawrence LoPatin ordered the construction of Michigan International Speedway to expand his recreational holdings. The facility was completed in 1968, running its first races in October of the same year. Soon after, the track fell into financial trouble after a series of business decisions by LoPatin to expand his auto racing company, American Raceways, sunk the company into major amounts of debt. In 1973, American Raceways sold ownership of the speedway to motorsports businessman Roger Penske, who saved the facility from financial ruin. Under Penske's leadership, the facility was expanded extensively. In 1999, the facility was sold off to the France family-owned International Speedway Corporation (ISC). MIS underwent major downsizing in the 2010s in efforts to modernize the facility, with capacity decreasing to more than half of its peak. Track ownership again changed hands in 2019, when NASCAR merged with ISC.

== Description ==
=== Configuration ===
The track in its current form is measured at 2.000 miles (3.219 km), with 18 degrees of banking in the turns, 12 degrees of banking on the frontstretch, and five degrees of banking on the backstretch. Numerous road track layouts exist within the track's infield and outside the track's confines. As part of the original construction plan, a road course designed by British racing driver Stirling Moss was made. The road course is split into three different layouts made to cater to different abilities of racers. Different layouts of 1.250 miles (2.012 km), 2.250 miles (3.621 km), and 3.500 miles (5.633 km) were reported by the Lansing State Journal.

=== Amenities ===
Michigan International Speedway is served by U.S. Route 12 and M-50, and covers over 1,400 acres according to The Daily Telegram. As of 2021, MIS has a capacity of 56,000 according to Autoweek. At its peak, the track boasted a seating capacity of 137,243 in 2006 according to Autoweek. MIS contains three luxury seating options: the Acceleration Club in the track's fourth turn, the Champions Club located underneath the track's press box, and the Victory Lane Club near the track's pit road.

== Track history ==
=== Planning and construction ===
In March 1966, treasurer of the newly built horse racing track Windsor Raceway, Lawrence LoPatin, expressed hopes of expanding the raceway into a "resort complex". After a visit to the Florida-based Sebring International Raceway, he decided that the first phase of expansion would include the construction of a "Grand Prix type auto-racing track, from 2.5 to 2.9 miles in length." After studying several markets, he decided to build a racetrack that would serve the Detroit, Cleveland, and Chicago areas. Four months later in July, LoPatin announced initial plans to build the Michigan Motor Raceway, a 400-acre (160 ha), 100,000-seat track on the intersection between Interstate 94 and U.S. Route 23 in Ann Arbor, Michigan. Although groundbreaking was scheduled to start on October 1, the plan was killed that same month due to mounting opposition from local residents. Another site approximately 4 miles (6.4 km) south of the original location was then considered. In April 1967, the site was revealed to be in Lenawee County in Cambridge Township, with LoPatin later stating in a press conference the following month that he hoped to start construction on the track in the next 90 days pending the formation of a financing plan for a budget of $4 million. By September, local media reported that the now 700-acre (280 ha), $4.5 million facility was set to open sometime in 1968. To finance the facility, track officials filed a registration statement in October to publicly offer common stocks and debentures that totaled approximately $3 million.

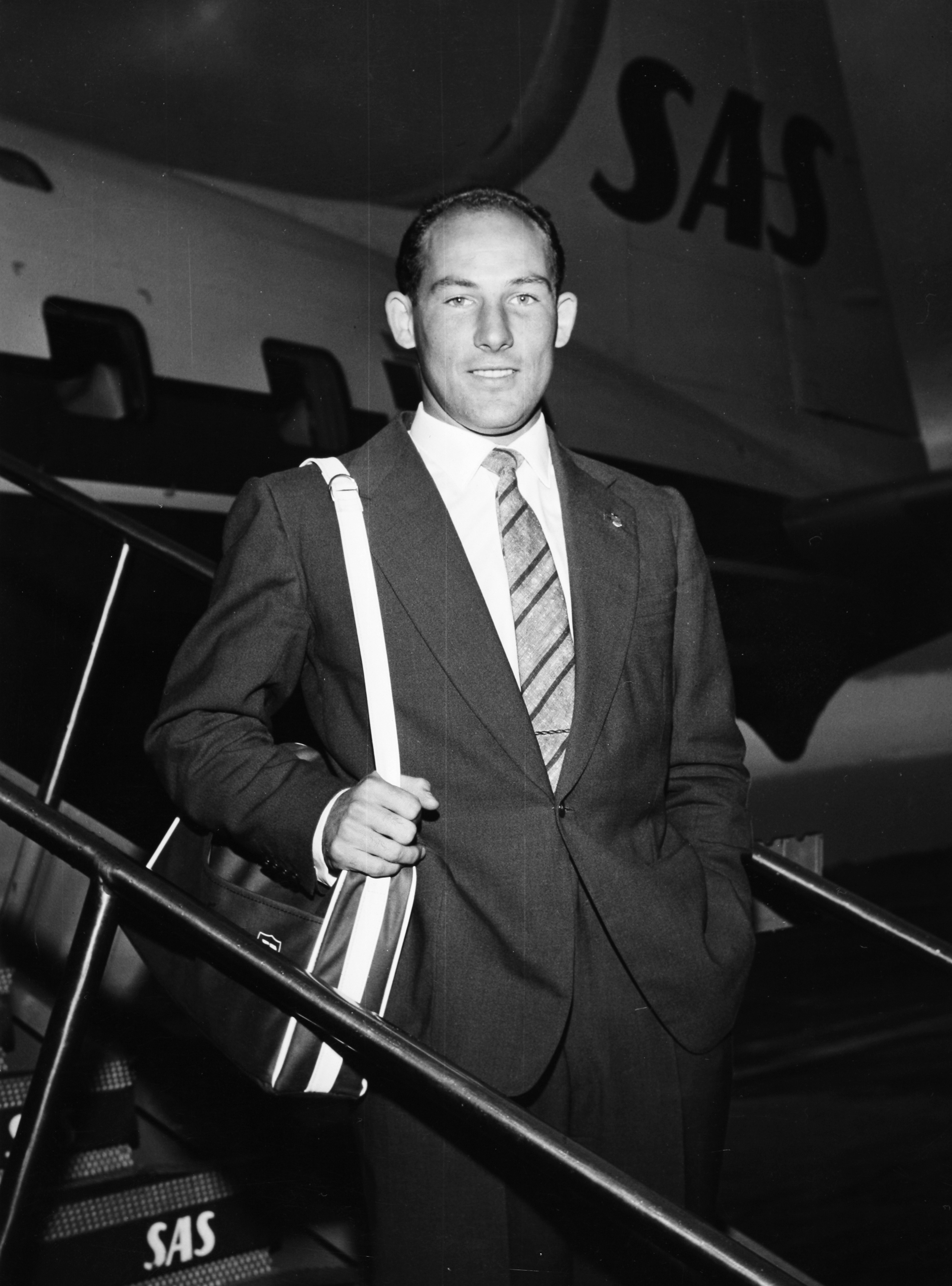
Stirling Moss (pictured in 1958) designed Michigan International Speedway's road course and assisted in designing the facility.

Groundbreaking on the Michigan International Speedway (MIS) occurred on September 27, 1967, with British racing driver Stirling Moss commencing construction. Initial plans for the facility included a 2-mile (3.2 km) oval designed by Charles Moneypenny and an "extension" road course layout designed by Moss, with Moss stating that the road course was split into three layouts meant to accommodate different skill levels of racers; one at 1.25 miles (2.01 km), one at 2.25 miles (3.62 km), and one at 3.5 miles (5.6 km). An opening date for MIS was set for October 6, 1968, with a 250-mile (400 km) IndyCar-style race inaugurating the facility; the date was later pushed back a week. For MIS' first race, two grandstands seating 12,500 were constructed, putting seating capacity at 25,000. In September, Gordon Johncock and Wally Dallenbach Sr. ran the first testing laps at the facility, with Johncock setting a fastest lap of 182.92 miles per hour (294.38 km/h).

=== Turbulent American Raceways years ===
MIS opened as scheduled on October 13, 1968, with Ronnie Bucknum winning the first ever race at the facility amidst a crowd of 55,108. Although the race was seen as a success, the facility experienced major traffic problems, with traffic jams on the two-lane U.S. Route 12 being reported as long as 7 miles (11 km). Three days after its inaugural race, NASCAR signed a 10-year contract to run two NASCAR Grand National Series races annually. In the following months, LoPatin struck numerous business deals to grow what would eventually become American Raceways, Inc. (ARI). In December, LoPatin announced a merger with the Atlanta International Raceway (AIR). Within the first couple months of 1969, he announced the construction of the Texas International Speedway and the purchase of controlling interest of the Riverside International Raceway. Later in the year, LoPatin stated his intents of building another facility in Burlington County, New Jersey. LoPatin's business endeavors were seen as a response to the rising popularity of auto racing in the United States in the 1960s, with LoPatin being a key figure in said expansion. The first NASCAR Cup Series race at MIS was run on June 15, with Cale Yarborough winning the event. In November, the track's first general manager, Frank Cipelle, was appointed.

By the end of the 1969 racing season, although the racing at MIS was praised, weather problems during all four major races in the season affected attendance and in turn, the facility's profits. American Raceways' troubles were soon publicized after their director of operations, Les Richter, left the company. MIS lacked a United States Auto Club (USAC) event after 1968 due to MIS disagreeing with USAC for the amount of purse money needed for a USAC race, depriving fans of promised major IndyCar racing. In addition, LoPatin entered into a dispute with NASCAR founder Bill France Sr. over how stock car racing should expand its popularity. In January 1970, ARI merged with the STP Corporation; by this point, ARI had amassed over $15 million in debt. Weather and subsequent attendance declines that year further compounded ARI's financial issues. Throughout the first half of 1970, LoPatin faced criticism for his handling of the Atlanta International Raceway, with AIR track officials leading campaigns to sack LoPatin after several executives either left or were fired by LoPatin.

==== Short-lived leadership of Les Richter ====
LoPatin was fired from his position as chairman of ARI on July 30, 1970, on the condition that the company continue its commitments to running the remaining events at ARI-owned tracks the following month. Les Richter, who had left the company a few months earlier, was appointed as the new chairman of ARI. Although MIS track officials stated optimistic hopes of revitalizing ARI by ending its mass expansion and cancelling the proposed New Jersey project, in October, Manufacturers National Bank initiated foreclosure proceedings to pay off over $1 million in overdue mortgage payments, with local Michigan law stating that the speedway had to be sold at a sheriff's auction in order to pay off the overdue payments. Despite the law, MIS general manager Frank Cipelle stated that the chances of the auction ever happening were "very little". After the auction was delayed twice, on January 10, 1971, the Associated Press reported that MIS' financial problems were resolved, with ARI selling its 48% interest of Riverside International Raceway worth $425,000 to avoid the auction. However, a year later, although Richter admitted that they were able to make a profit in the 1971 racing season, it was not enough to pay off the facility's debentures. As a result, MIS submitted a bankruptcy petition, entering receivership. The ousted LoPatin was asked by Richter to create a financing plan to save the track from liquidation in March; however, all plans fell through, and the track was ordered to be sold at a sheriff's auction in December.

=== Roger Penske era ===
==== Early Penske years ====
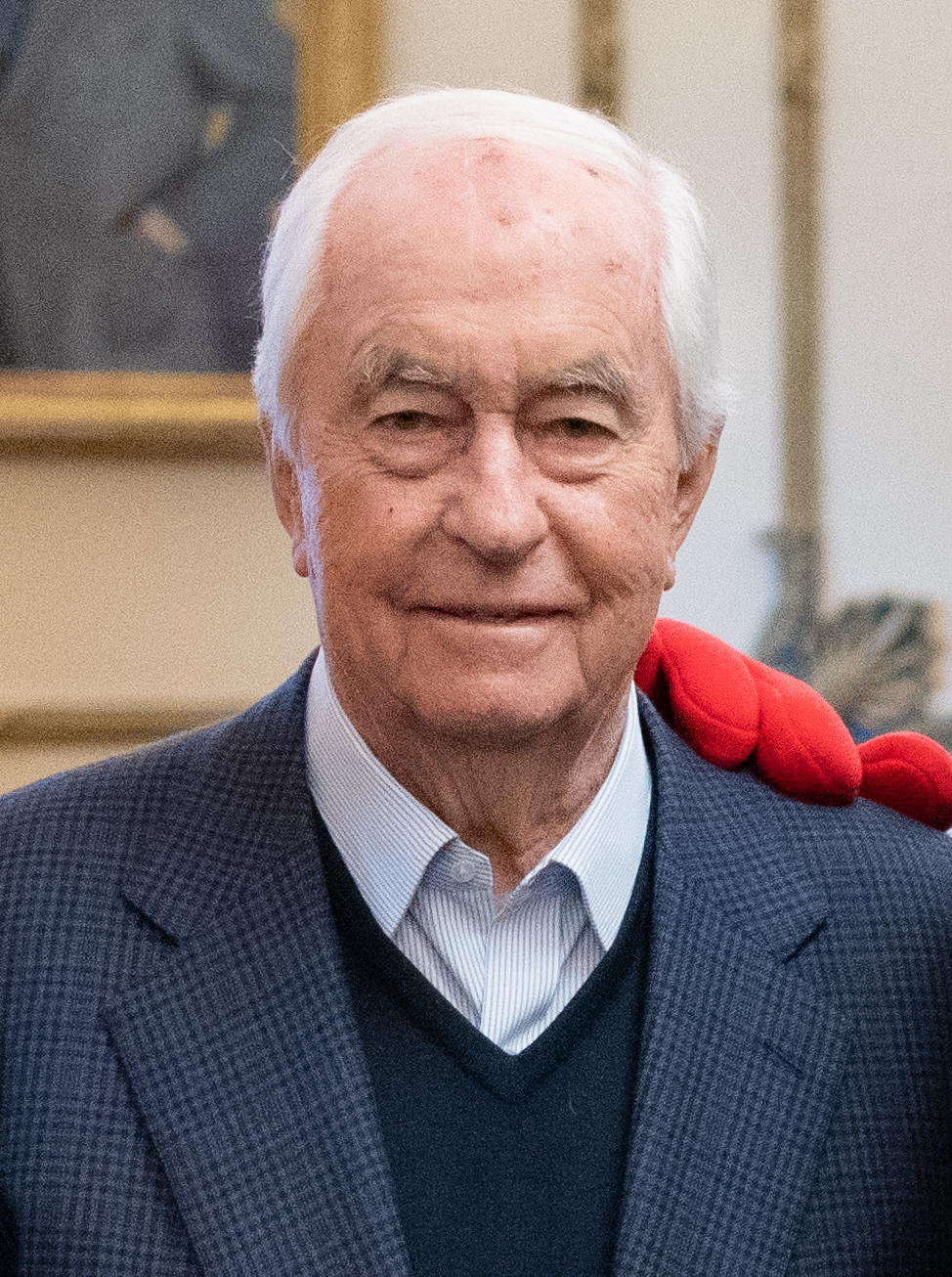
Roger Penske (pictured in 2023) bought Michigan International Raceway from American Raceways, saving the facility from financial trouble.

Initially, an offer was made by the Manufacturers National Bank of Detroit for $1.458 million was made in December, with oil businessman Pat Patrick and car dealership owner James S. Gilmore Jr. taking over the facility if the purchase went through. By March 1973, Patrick along with two other businessmen agreed to buy out the facility for $2.5 million, with the sale effective on June 14. However, on May 26, motorsports businessman Roger Penske announced that he had taken over the option to purchase the facility from Patrick, with Penske stating that the announcement of Patrick buying the facility "was a bit premature." Penske's purchase was approved by judge David Patton on June 1, with Penske paying $2.7 million for the facility.

Upon the purchase's approval, Penske stated in a press conference that he aimed to renovate the garage area and numerous spectator amenities along with repaving the oval's surface. He also cautioned that the track's schedule may be cut down depending on how races in June and July of that year did. General manager Frank Cipelle left his position soon after Penske's purchase, being replaced by John LeFere. Official attendance estimates of the next two races reached 88,500, being seen as a success in local Michigan media. As a result, Penske approved the running of a doubleheader IndyCar race, revitalizing the track. By the next year, Penske proclaimed in the Detroit Free Press that MIS had the "greatest potential of any track in the U.S.", with Penske stating in an interview with the Free Press' Joe Falls that he aimed to expand seating capacity if attendance remained high. Penske later stated that year that he hoped to eventually expand the facility to seat more than 100,000.

Renovations and incidents under Penske's early leadership remained slow. Initially, Penske sought to construct a roval-style road course contained within the infield of MIS to replace the original road course layout, but the plans were postponed due to a contractor's strike. In 1977, a resurfacing of MIS' track surface was announced in August and completed approximately two months later. In the early 1980s, MIS added seating capacity a total of three times, adding in 1981, 1982, and 1985. In 1986, MIS underwent another resurfacing that was completed in time for the 1986 Miller American 400. That same year, MIS oversaw its first driver fatality when NASCAR driver Rick Baldwin crashed during a qualifying session on June 16, dying 11 years later in a coma due to complications from the crash. The following year, track officials planned to add a dog-leg chicane on the track's backstretch to slow down speeds for IndyCar races; however, the idea was scrapped after testing. In 1988, MIS expanded grandstand seating capacity to "over 40,000." In 1992, Clifford Allison became the second fatality to occur at the facility when he crashed during a practice session for a NASCAR Busch Series race.

Numerous leadership changes occurred until the mid-1980s. In 1978, LeFere resigned from his position as general manager, being replaced by Citibank executive Jim Melvin. Melvin left soon after to become the president of Championship Auto Racing Teams (CART), being replaced by United Airlines executive Rick Nadeau in November 1979. Nadeau left track leadership three years later to become a sports marketer for a printing company, with Darwin Doll replacing Nadeau. Doll held the position until 1986, when he was replaced by Gene Haskett when Doll left to serve as the general manager of Sears Point International Raceway.

==== Mass expansion in twilight Penske years, CART incident ====
In the 1990s, MIS underwent mass expansion to accommodate the growth of popularity in NASCAR. In 1990, Haskett announced even further renovations to the facility, including the addition of 5,779 seats, additional bathrooms, and a new backstretch concrete wall. Two years later, 11,700 seats were added to increase the seating capacity to "about 70,000" along with a new 96 ft (29 m) tall scoreboard. By 1993, with the addition of 6,700 seats, track attendance for races began to rival the Michigan state record for attendance at a sporting event. Amidst criticism of the track surface for being too bumpy, the track surface was repaved in the winter of 1995. Additional seats were added in 1994, 1996, 1997, and 1999, increasing the grandstand seating capacity to over 125,000. In 1996, MIS renamed itself to Michigan Speedway in order to be named similar to other tracks Penske owned. On July 26, 1998, three fans were killed and a further six were injured during a Championship Auto Racing Teams (CART) event when a crash involving Adrián Fernández sent a tire into the grandstands. In response to the incident, the protective catchfence around the track was increased by four feet.

=== International Speedway Corporation and NASCAR eras ===
==== Purchase by ISC, renovations ====
In May 1999, Penske, who by this point owned numerous tracks under the Penske Motorsports Inc. name, including Michigan Speedway, agreed to merge the company with the France family-owned International Speedway Corporation, officially merging approximately two months later. The following year, the speedway reverted back to its original Michigan International Speedway name, revealing a new logo in the process. At the end of 2000, Haskett retired after 14 years of service, being replaced by W. Brett Shelton as general manager. In 2004, the track's walls were replaced with SAFER barriers in response as part of an effort to make the track safer in the wake of the death of Dale Earnhardt. That same year, Shelton announced the construction and renovation of numerous amenities, including the construction of a "multi-level sky lounge" built behind the frontstretch grandstands. In 2006, Shelton retired from his position, giving the position up to Roger Curtis, California Speedway's vice president of marketing and sales. Renovations to the first turn grandstands were announced in 2008. The following year, track officials announced the demolition of the track's old media center, replacing it with a two-story, solar-powered media center. In 2011, further renovations were announced to the facility's tram system and the track's scoreboard. The following year, the track was repaved for the fourth time in its history.

==== Capacity decline, change to NASCAR ownership ====
In the 2010s, MIS underwent a big mass capacity decrease. In 2010, track officials announced the removal of 12,000 seats in the track's third turn in an effort to modernize the track. In 2012, MIS track officials also announced the construction of a luxury campsite complex, in the process tearing down grandstands in the track's third and fourth turns. By 2014, after another set of grandstands in the track's third turn were torn down, capacity was recorded to be as low as 71,000. In 2016, Curtis resigned from his position, being replaced by minor league baseball executive Rick Brenner. In 2018, seating capacity went down further to 56,000 to build a new campground area. In 2019, the ownership of MIS switched hands to NASCAR when ISC and NASCAR merged in a $2 billion buyout. That same year, a new care center was built in the track's infield. In October 2021, NASCAR's director of marketing for the American Midwest, Joe Fowler, replaced a resigning Rick Brenner to become the track's general manager.

== Events ==
=== Racing ===
==== NASCAR ====
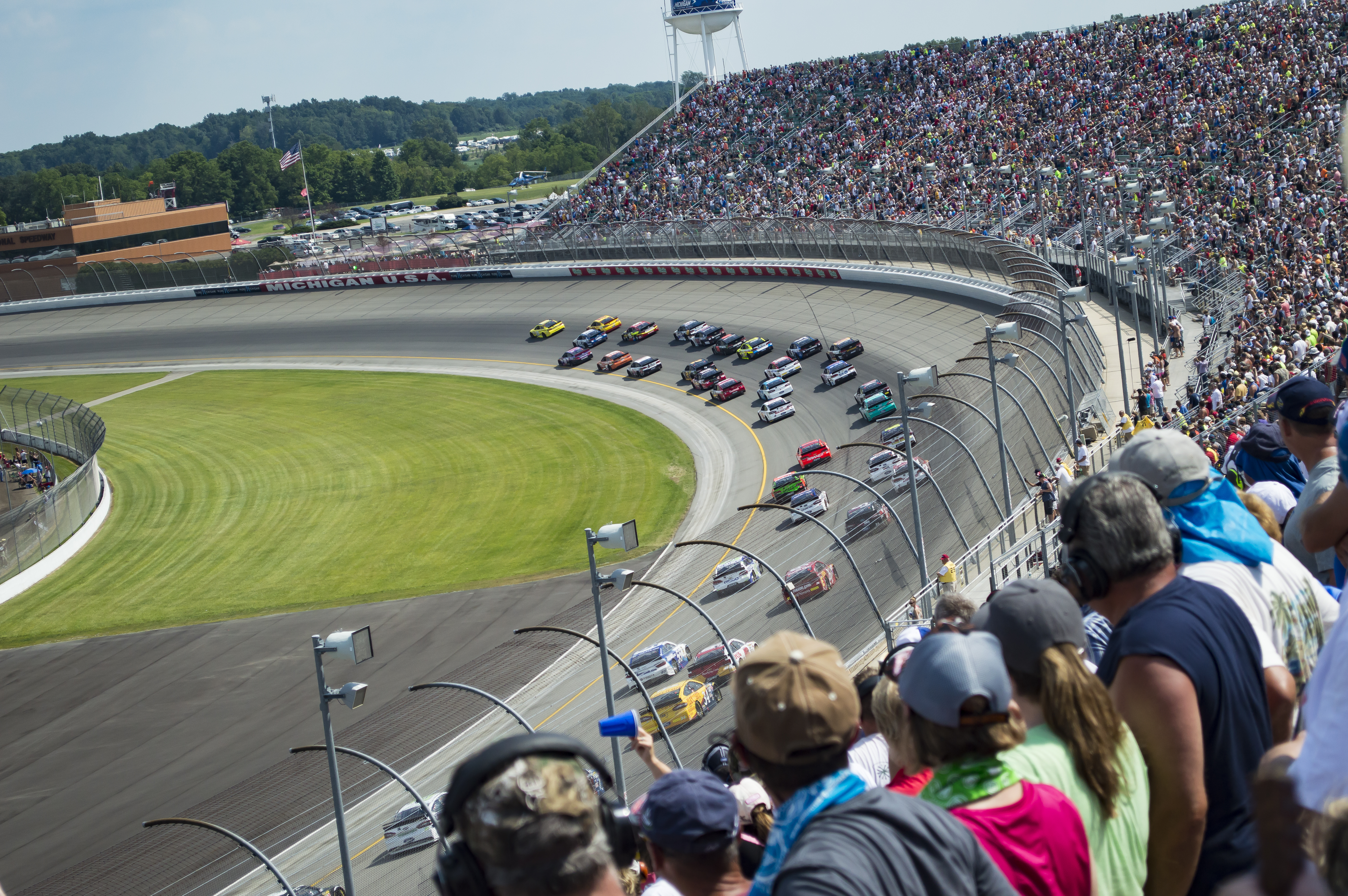
A NASCAR Cup Series race at Michigan International Speedway in 2015. The series has been racing at the facility since 1969.

MIS currently hosts one annual NASCAR weekend, it is highlighted by a NASCAR Cup Series race known as the FireKeepers Casino 400. It also currently hosts the NASCAR Truck Series' DQS Solutions & Staffing 250 is a support race for the Cup Series race. MIS previously hosted a NASCAR Xfinity Series race.

==== Open-Wheel Racing ====
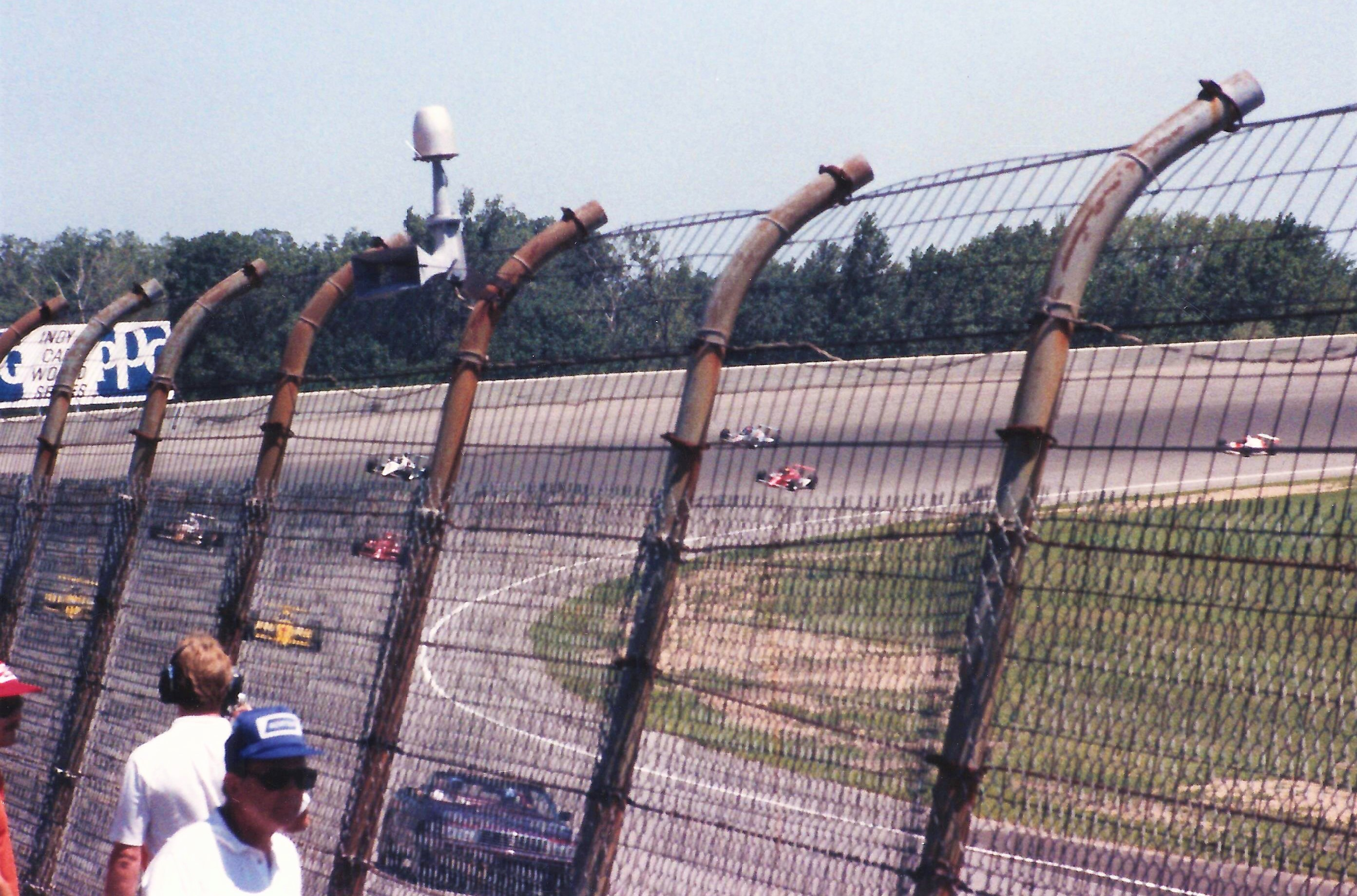
A Championship Auto Racing Teams (CART) race at Michigan International Speedway in 1988. Until 2007, Indy car-style races were held at the facility.

Through the early 2000s, open-wheel racing was commonplace at the facility. Major open-wheel races at MIS were primarily sanctioned by three organizations: the United States Auto Club (USAC), Championship Auto Racing Teams (CART), and the Indy Racing League (IRL). USAC held its first event at the speedway in October 1968; the speedway's inaugural event. After failing to renew the following year, USAC was able to return to the facility in 1970, and began a traditional summer race (July or August). Starting in 1973, USAC sanctioned a second event at the track that took place in the fall. USAC continued to race at MIS until 1978, after which time CART took over both dates.

The track's summer date was extended to a 500 mi (800 km) race in 1981. The race was sanctioned by CART until 2002, when the IRL officially took over the sanctioning rights for the race. With the IRL taking over, the race distance was decreased to 400 mi (640 km). IRL raced annually at the track until 2007, when the IRL failed to renew a deal to keep racing at the facility; the IRL remains the last open-wheel series to have raced at the facility.

The latter fall date ran until 1986, when the date was dropped from CART's schedule in efforts to eliminate instances of CART racing at a venue twice per year. In the midst of the CART–IRL split in the mid-1990s, CART organized a second event in 1996 that was made to rival the Indianapolis 500: the U.S. 500, which ran on the same day as the Indianapolis 500. However, after one iteration of the event, the race was scrapped.

==== Other racing events ====
- Starting in 1974, the International Race of Champions (IROC) raced at the facility. The series raced there annually until 1979. IROC returned annually in 1984, and with the exception of 1986, the facility became a fixture on the IROC schedule. IROC ran its final race at the facility in 2001.
- Since 1996, MIS has hosted the cross country finals for the Michigan High School Athletic Association (MHSAA).

=== Other events ===
- Starting in 2012, MIS was the ending point for the Wish-A-Mile bike charity ride organized by the Make-A-Wish Foundation. It last appeared on the ride's itinerary in 2017.
- Since 2013, the facility has played host to the Faster Horses Festival, a country music festival.

== Lap records ==
As of June 2019, the fastest official race lap records at Michigan International Speedway are listed as:

| Category | Time | Driver | Vehicle | Event |
D-shaped Oval (1968–present): 2.000 mi (3.219 km)
| CART | 0:30.767 | Adrián Fernández | Lola T96/00 | 1996 Marlboro 500 |
| IndyCar | 0:32.2730 | Bryan Herta | Dallara IR-03 | 2003 Firestone Indy 400 |
| NASCAR Cup | 0:36.093 | Kevin Harvick | Ford Fusion | 2018 FireKeepers Casino 400 |
| Indy Lights | 0:37.3349 | Alfred Unser | Dallara IPS | 2004 Paramount Health Insurance 100 |
| NASCAR Xfinity | 0:38.290 | Paul Menard | Ford Mustang | 2019 LTi Printing 250 |
| NASCAR Truck | 0:38.666 | Myatt Snider | Ford F-150 | 2018 Corrigan Oil 200 |
Infield Road Course (1968–present): 1.900 mi (3.058 km)
| IMSA GTP | 1:06.060 | Bill Whittington | March 84G | 1984 Michigan 500k |
| IMSA GTO | 1:12.210 | Chester Vincentz | Porsche 934 | 1984 Michigan 500k |
| IMSA GTU | 1:13.960 | Bob Bergstrom | Porsche 924 Carrera GTR | 1984 Michigan 500k |
Extended Road Course (1968–1994): 3.310 mi (5.327 km)
| Can-Am | 1:36.100 | Denny Hulme | McLaren M8B | 1969 Michigan International Can-Am |
| Trans-Am | 1:50.300 | Mark Donohue | AMC Javelin | 1971 Michigan Trans-Am round |
