= Developer (album) =

Studio album by Silkworm
- Released: 1997
- Genre: Indie rock
- Length: 36:44
- Label: Matador
- Producer: Steve Albini

Silkworm chronology
| Firewater (1996) | Developer (1997) | Blueblood (1998) |

Professional ratings
Review scores
| Source | Rating |
|---|---|
| AllMusic | 3/5 stars |
| The Encyclopedia of Popular Music | 3/5 stars |
| MusicHound Rock: The Essential Album Guide | 3.5/5 stars |

Developer is the fifth full-length studio album by indie rock band Silkworm, released in 1997. It was their second and final album released on Matador Records before they moved to Touch and Go.

A remastered and expanded 2x12" edition of Developer, including five Japan-only bonus tracks, was announced by Comedy Minus One for release in early 2025.

== Critical reception ==
The Stranger called the album "dour, funny, casual, intense, refined, and raw." CMJ New Music Monthly wrote that the songs "seem to have been sequenced to maximize the contrast between bassist Tim Midgett's tersely emotional lyrics and guitarist Andy Cohen's sardonic, anecdotal style." Miami New Times wrote that Silkworm's songs "unwind slowly and abstractly, with Cohen's busy but lyrical solos tearing out a center in the rhythms – skidding off on surprising tangents, never going for any predictable or simple momentum." The Chicago Reader praised the album's "frantic guitar, strangulated vocals, and drunken drumming."

== Track listing ==
1. "Give Me Some Skin" – (3:33)
2. "Never Met a Man I Didn't Like" – (3:18)
3. "The City Glows" – (3:06)
4. "Developer" – (3:04)
5. "The Devil Is Beating His Wife" – (3:09)
6. "Ice Station Zebra" – (3:16)
7. "Waiting on a Train" – (3:27)
8. "Sheep Wait for Wolf" – (4:38)
9. "Goodnight Mr. Maugham" – (5:19)
10. "It's Too Bad..." – (3:14)

== Personnel ==
- Steve Albini—Engineer
- Andy Cohen—Guitar, Vocals on 2, 4, 6, 8, & 9
- Michael Dahlquist—Drums
- Tim Midyett—Bass, Vocals on 1, 3, 5, 7, & 10
