= Jeanette Sliwinski =

American model

- Born: 1982 (age 43–44); Chicago, Illinois
- Status: Paroled
- Conviction: Reckless homicide
- Penalty: 8 years in prison (served 3)

Jeanette Sliwinski (born 1982) is an American convicted murderer. She was found guilty of reckless homicide for an incident on July 14, 2005 when she attempted suicide while driving, causing a crash that resulted in the deaths of three local musicians, John Glick, Douglas Meis, and Michael Dahlquist. She served three years in prison.

== Early life ==
Jeanette Sliwinski was born in 1982, a daughter of Polish immigrants. She attended Niles West High School. After graduating from high school she began taking on modeling jobs to help finance her bachelor's degree in marketing. After high school she took a career as a local print model in which her pictures ended up in calendars and lingerie ads. In 2002 she moved to Los Angeles and worked as a trade show model.

== Murder charge ==
On July 14, 2005 after a fight with her mother, Sliwinski burst out the door and took her car out in an alleged attempt to take her own life by speeding down Dempster Street in Skokie, Illinois. She ran a red light at high speed, colliding with a car carrying John Glick of The Returnables, Douglas Meis of The Dials and EXO, and Michael Dahlquist of Silkworm. Both vehicles flipped over. The first calls to Skokie 911 came in about 12:15 pm. Before Meis died, he and Sliwinski were both taken to the hospital in ambulances. Police wanted to interview Meis before he went into emergency surgery, but they were too late and Meis died 10 minutes later from multiple injuries. When police interviewed Sliwinski, asking if she purposely drove into the car, she repeatedly changed her story. At 5:30 P.M. on the afternoon of July 15 Skokie police officers arrested Sliwinski in her hospital room. After the crash, Sliwinski underwent surgery for a broken ankle at St. Francis Hospital in Evanston before being transferred to the Cermak Health Services in the Cook County Jail. She was later charged with three counts of first-degree murder and two counts of aggravated battery.

== Trial and imprisonment ==
Sliwinski pleaded not guilty by reason of insanity and her trial began on October 15, 2007. In an attempt to prove Sliwiniki's diminished mental state, her attorneys showed records that she had been admitted to a Chicago psychiatric hospital only two weeks before the crash and that she had been released after only one day. Sliwinski was found not guilty of first degree murder but was convicted of a lesser charge of reckless homicide. She was sentenced to eight years in prison, with the possibility of parole after 19 months of good behavior. Upon hearing of the results, a statement from bandmates of the three dead musicians said "words failed them". Sliwinski served her sentence at Dwight Correctional Center, a maximum security woman's prison about 80 miles southwest of downtown Chicago. Prison officials secretly transferred Sliwinski from the Dwight Correctional Center to the Lincoln Correctional Center near Springfield, Illinois for her protection.

== Release from prison ==
Sliwinski was paroled on the morning of October 2, 2008 from the Lincoln Correctional Center. Sliwinski's incarceration was reduced by an Illinois law that can cut sentences in half. She also received credit for time spent in the Cook County Jail awaiting trial, six months' reduction for good behavior, and three months' reduction for receiving counseling while in prison. The Illinois Department of Corrections received death threats directed towards Sliwinski shortly before her release. As a result, police stood guard outside her family's home in Morton Grove. Sliwinski was on probation for a year until October 2, 2009. Her driver's license is eligible to be reinstated as of 2010.

== Appearance in media ==
On August 10, 2008, Sliwinski's story was featured on the Oxygen television series Snapped, which focuses on female criminals. The show did not contain any statements from Sliwinski or her family.
