= Emperor Penguin (band) =

American electronic music duo

- Origin: Chicago, Illinois, U.S.
- Genres: Electronic, electro-funk
- Label: My Pal God Records
- Members: DJ Lazlo Minimart; Melvoin Stanke

Emperor Penguin is an American Chicago-based electronic music duo consisting of DJ Lazlo Minimart and keyboardist Melvoin Stanke. Their sound combines samples, synths, found sounds, and electro-funk. In 1999, they released their debut album, Shatter the Illusion of Integrity, Yeah. A second full-length album, Extreme Gaming, followed later that year. They asked their fans to vote on their label's website to determine the title of their third album which was released in 2000 as Mysterious Pony. In 2001, they put released a four-song EP, which featured bassist/guitarist Jack Flapjack, keyboardist Nord 2000 and drummer Ferrari on two tracks.

== Discography ==
- Shatter the Illusion of Integrity, Yeah (1999)
- Extreme Gaming (1999)
- Mysterious Pony (2000)
- Damn (2001)
