= Hilda Ferguson =

American dancer and showgirl (1903–1933)

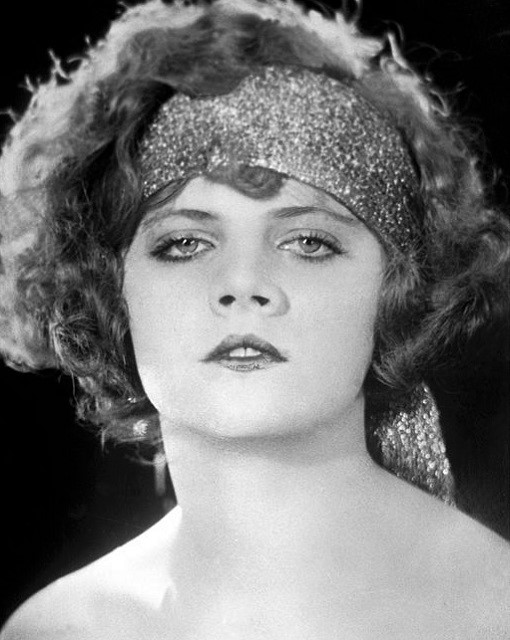
- Ferguson, c. 1924
- Born: Hildegarde Gibbons; January 16, 1903; Baltimore, MD
- Died: October 3, 1933 (aged 30); Manhattan, NY, U.S.
- Occupation: Showgirl
- Spouse: Robert Belmont Ugarte (m. 1919, divorced)

Hilda Ferguson (born Hildegarde Gibbons; 1903-1933) was an American dancer and showgirl.

== Early years ==
Ferguson was the youngest of six children born to Robert Lee Gibbons, a sign painter, and Demariah (Sterling) Gibbons in the Hamilton neighborhood of Baltimore. At the age of 15, she eloped with Honduran dental student Robert Ugarte and was married on June 2, 1919. The following year, she gave birth to a daughter, Yolanda Emily. Ferguson left her husband and child and moved to New York City around 1921.

== Broadway career ==
Ferguson's first mention as an entertainer came on June 23, 1922, when she was noted as a "Bathing Beach Revue" member at Murray's Cabaret on 42nd Street. The notice was primarily about the dismissal of a police indecency charge against the show.

Later that year, her career was significantly boosted when she was cast in The Music Box Revue on Broadway. She participated in the Ziegfeld Follies of 1923, 1924, and 1925. Her last major show was the musical Yours Truly, which ran in 1927.

Ferguson's primary claim to fame in entertainment was as a Ziegfeld girl, renowned for her "Great Shimmy Dance," reportedly performed in an elaborate feathered headdress.

== Personal life ==
Ferguson had a consistently turbulent personal life. In March 1923, her roommate, model Dorothy "Dot" King, was murdered. Police considered Ferguson a suspect, as she reportedly had a dramatic falling out with King just before the latter's death. There was also suspicion regarding Ferguson's abrupt departure for Europe soon after the crime. The murder was never solved.

After her last show, Ferguson announced a plan to marry Aaron Benesch, a sixty-year-old millionaire; the wedding never happened. She was romantically linked to various men, including the actor George Raft, composer Arthur Gershwin, and bootlegger Nucky Johnson. She was arrested as a material witness in 1931 after a lover, gangster "Tough Willie" McCabe, was stabbed.

She had a serious drinking problem and has been described as "the blonde darling of the underworld who could pour an incredible amount of straight gin through her pert rosebud lips." She spent the end of her life "broke and broken" in her native Baltimore.

== Death ==
Ferguson died in 1933 from peritonitis, an infection of the digestive tract. She was buried in an unmarked grave in Loudon Park Cemetery in Baltimore, Maryland. (Her Find a Grave page shows a tombstone.)
