= The Hammer of God =

The Hammer of God may refer to:

== Literature ==
- The Hammer of God (Clarke novel), a 1993 novel by Arthur C. Clarke
- "The Hammer of God" (short story), a short story by G. K. Chesterton, c. 1911
- The Hammer of God (DeMille novel), a 1974 novel by Nelson DeMille
- The Hammer of God (Bo Giertz novel), a 1941 novel by Bishop Bo Giertz
- Hammer of God (Miller novel), a 2009 novel by Karen Miller

== Other ==
- Hammer of God (album), a 1999 album by Mortification
- "The Hammer of God", a nickname for baseball player Mariano Rivera
- The Hammer of God, an alternate title for the 1970 film The Chinese Boxer

== See also ==
- Hammer of the Gods (disambiguation)
