= The Crust Brothers =

American band

- Origin: Stockton, California
- Genres: Indie rock, lo-fi
- Spinoffs: Silkworm
- Members: Stephen Malkmus; Michael Dahlquist; Tim Midgett; Andy Cohen

The Crust Brothers were a band formed by Stephen Malkmus and members of Silkworm (Michael Dahlquist, Tim Midgett, and Andy Cohen). They released one album, Marquee Mark, a live recording of their December 5, 1997, show at the Crocodile Cafe in Seattle, Washington.

The show was a benefit for the Washington Wilderness Coalition. The band stuck exclusively to covers (Malkmus sang lead on Silkworm's "Never met a man I didn't like"), refusing to play any Pavement songs—most notably the requested "Summer Babe." Of the 12 covers on Marquee Mark, seven are from Bob Dylan & The Band's The Basement Tapes.

Music critic Greil Marcus devoted a January 1999 Interview article to the show. Marcus wrote of "Heard it through the grapevine," "while the Crust Brothers are inside it, [it] can sound like the best version of the song ever played."

Additional shows took place on December 30, 1998, at The Breakroom in Seattle, and on January 1, 1999, at the Starfish Room in Vancouver, British Columbia. The band returned to the Crocodile Cafe on December 31, 2000. A song from that set, a cover of Dylan's "Spanish Harlem Incident" sung by Dahlquist, is the sixth track on Silkworm's final EP, Chokes!

== Discography ==
- Marquee Mark (1998)
