= Del Rey =

Del Rey (Spanish for "Of the King"), Delrey or Del Re may refer to:

== Places ==
- Del Rey, California, a census-designated place
- Del Rey, Los Angeles, California, a small district in the west side of Los Angeles
- Delrey, Illinois, an unincorporated community
- Del Rey Beach State Recreation Site, a state park in Oregon
- Isla del Rey, Chile, the largest island in the Los Ríos Region
- Isla del Rey, Panama, the largest island in the Pearl Islands
- Isla del Rey, Chafarinas, an island in the Chafarinas Islands, Spain

== People ==
- Ana del Rey (born 1985), Spanish actor
- Del Rey (musician) (born 1959), blues singer-songwriter and guitarist
- Geraldo Del Rey (1930–1993), Brazilian actor
- Judy-Lynn del Rey (1943–1986), science fiction editor and Lester del Rey's wife
- Lana Del Rey (born 1985), American singer-songwriter
- Lester del Rey (1915–1993), science fiction author and editor
- Pilar Del Rey (1929–2025), American actress
- Sara Del Rey, a ring name of American professional wrestler Sara Ann Amato (born 1980)

== Other uses ==
- Del Rey (band), an American band
- Del Rey Books, a branch of Random House specializing in fantasy and science fiction books, founded by Lester and Judy Lynn del Rey
  - Del Rey Manga, an imprint of Del Rey Books, specializing in manga
- Ford Del Rey, a Brazilian car built from 1981 to 1991
- Copa del Rey, an annual Spanish football cup competition

== See also ==
- Koos de la Rey (1847–1914), Boer general in the Second Boer War
- Del Ray (disambiguation)
- Danny Del-Re (born 1968), Australian footballer
- Emanuela Del Re (born 1963), Italian politician
