= Arthur Ellen =

American hypnotist and author

- Ellen in Washington, D. C., 1958
- Born: c. 1912
- Died: January 1987; Los Angeles, CA, U.S.
- Occupation: Hypnotist

Arthur Ellen was an American hypnotist and author who lived in Northridge.

== Career ==
During his career, which lasted 46 years, The Los Angeles Times reported that Ellen "freed noted ballplayers including Nolan Ryan, Orlando Cepeda, Roberto Clemente and Maury Wills of their pre-game jitters." Ellen was unsuccessful in his attempt to become the official hypnotist to the Los Angeles Dodgers.

Jackie Jensen and Bob Oldis were other baseball players who were hypnotized by Ellen. Jensen sought Ellen's help to overcome his fear of flying. Ellen however, couldn't help him. He surmised that Jensen’s fear of flying was a mask for his desire to stay home and mend his failing marriage.

Hollywood actors, including Eddie Albert and Tony Curtis, also sought and received help from Ellen. His hypnotic sessions with them enhanced their ability to memorize scripts more effectively.

Ellen also used hypnosis to help patients overcome fear of dentist drills, shots, agoraphobia and claustrophobia.

Ellen had a popular nightclub show, performing it at several national and international venues including Sahara Hotel, Harrah’s, Fairmont Hotel, Town & Country Club, Grossinger's Catskill Resort Hotel, Elmwood Casino, Bimbo's 365 Club among others.

Ellen appeared on The Mike Douglas Show on December 9, 1964.

During his shows, Ellen reportedly had the ability to cause people in the audience to sing, dance and perform "feats of strength while under his trance." Alan Haft, son of Harry Haft the boxer, stated in his book that Ellen "made them laugh or cry at will, eat imaginary ice cream, assume new identities..." Alan's father, Harry Haft, was hypnotized by Ellen before his bout with Rocky Marciano, which helped Haft overcome the fear plaguing him minutes before the fight began. Haft's fear however, wasn't related to fighting Marciano. It was the result of an unscheduled meeting that he had with three Mafia thugs shortly before the bout began. They uninvitedly entered his dressing room and threatened him, purposely persuading him to throw the fight. Haft lost the fight to Marciano that night. He later claimed that he didn't lose on purpose.

On October 7, 1955, 19-year-old college student Pat Morris, was hypnotized by Ellen during an episode of Truth or Consequences. On a table in front of her was $100,000. If she was able to get up and pick up the money, it would've been hers. However, she was unable to do so while in Ellen’s hypnotic trance.

On November 19, 1956, the Port Angeles Evening News reported that Ellen sent a telegram to President Eisenhower, urging him to hypnotize his Thanksgiving turkey before killing it. Ellen promised him that it "tastes better due to the absence of adrenalin in the bloodstream and plucks easier because the muscles holding the feathers are relaxed."

In the July 24, 1958 issue of Jet magazine, Ellen and singer Abbey Lincoln are pictured backstage hamming it up during a Washington, D.C. appearance at an unnamed venue.

Around 1960, Ellen began working out of his own (medical building) office that was located on Wilshire Boulevard in Los Angeles.

== Personal life and death ==
Ellen had three daughters. He died of throat cancer in 1987 at the age of 75.
