= Eyeball Skeleton =

- Origin: Washington, D.C.
- Genres: Indie rock
- Label: My Pal God

Eyeball Skeleton is an American indie rock band from Washington, D.C. The group has attracted attention for its pre-teen membership.

== History ==
Eyeball Skeleton is composed of Bill Brown (guitar, percussion, programming) and his sons Charlie Brown (guitar) and J.J. Brown (bass), ages 10 and 8 as of 2005. Brown founded the group after hearing his children attempting to mimic his own music-making in the house. Their name was invented by the children; JJ provided "Eyeball" and Charlie provided "Skeleton". The group writes songs based upon song titles, lyrics, or pictures created by the children, which are then fleshed out musically with the father. Their debut album, #1, was released on My Pal God Records on April 5, 2005. Following the release, the band appeared on Pancake Mountain and toured with The French Kicks and Drums & Tuba.

== Discography ==
- #1 (My Pal God, 2005)
