= Hammer of the Gods (album) =

Studio album by Bottomless Pit
- Released: 2007
- Genre: Indie rock; noise rock
- Label: Comedy Minus One

Professional ratings
Review scores
Source	Rating
The A.V. Club	B+
Cokemachineglow	82%
Pitchfork Media	8.3/10
Popmatters	7/10
Spin	3.5/5 stars
Tiny Mix Tapes	3.5/5 stars

Hammer of the Gods is the first studio album by the American indie rock band Bottomless Pit, released in 2007 through Comedy Minus One Records. The album was recorded with Greg Norman at Studio Greg Studios II and Electrical Audio. The album was mixed at Electrical Audio. It was mastered at Abbey Road.

== Track listing ==
1. "The Cardinal Movements" – 4:21
2. "Dogtag" – 3:30
3. "Repossession" – 3:13
4. "Leave the Light On" – 5:48
5. "Dead Man's Blues" – 4:21
6. "Human Out of Me" – 5:23
7. "Greenery" – 3:50
8. "Sevens Sing" – 6:56
