= Bee Palmer =

American dancer and singer (1903–1933)

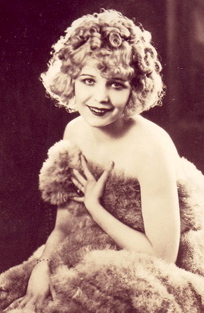
- Palmer, c. 1918
- Born: Beatrice Charlotta Palmer; September 11, 1894; Chicago, Illinois, U.S.
- Died: December 22, 1967 (aged 73); Manhattan, New York, U.S.
- Occupations: Singer; Dancer; Showgirl
- Spouses: Albert Siegel, 1921-1928 (div); Sol "Sonny" Taubin, 1942-? (div)

Bee Palmer (born Beatrice Charlotta Palmer, September 11, 1894 – December 22, 1967) was an American singer, dancer, and showgirl who achieved fame during the Jazz Age as the "Shimmy Queen."

== Early years ==
Bee Palmer was born in Chicago, Illinois, to Charley A. Palmer and his wife, Anna (Larson) Palmer. She reportedly began performing before World War I, "around the cafes of South Chicago where she would sit at tables and croon to guests" for small sums. She also danced professionally and is said to have dubbed herself the "Shimmie Queen" by 1914.

== Stage career ==
Palmer first attracted significant attention as a "Western girl" performing in the Ziegfeld Follies of 1918. She got a good review for singing "I Want to Learn to Jazz Dance". She also won acclaim for her role in the Ziegfeld Midnight Frolic of 1918. Described as "a blonde with trained shoulders who can sing rag and act jazz," she sang "Let Me Shimmy and be Satisfied". Another reviewer was less impressed with the same show, stating that Palmer "did the vulgar shimmy in a tightly fitting cerise dress trimmed merely with a cord at the waistline".

Palmer was widely credited as the inventor of shimmy, although other white dancers, including Gilda Gray and Mae West, also claimed to have originated the act. Despite these assertions, the dance's origins remain contested, although it almost certainly had African American roots. Palmer herself was said to call the shimmy an African American "folk dance".

Palmer reaped fame when the shimmy became a craze personifying the "madcap exuberance and permissive morals of the Jazz Age". The dance inspired several popular songs, including "Shimmee Town" (performed in the Ziegfeld Follies of 1919), "Shim-Me-King's Blues" (recorded by Mamie Smith in 1921), "I Wish I Could Shimmy Like My Sister Kate", and "Shim-Me-Sha-Wabble" (1923).

Such was Palmer's shimmy fame, that she became one of the people who personified the Roaring Twenties. One writer described her as:

Taken the raw human - all too human - stuff of the underworld, with its sighs of sadness and regret, its mad merriment, its swift blaze of passion, its turbulent dances, its outlaw music, its songs of the social bandit, and made a new art product of the theatre. She is to the sources of jazz and the blues what François Villon was to the wildlife of Paris. Both have found exquisite blossoms of art in the sector of life most removed from the concert room and the boudoir, and their harvest has the vigor, the resolute life, the stimulating quality, the indelible impress of daredevil, care-free, do-as-you-please lives of the picturesque men and women who defy convention.

Palmer began touring in 1921 with a revue called Oh Bee! The band was called 'Bee Palmer's New Orleans Rhythm Kings' and included such notables as Emmett Hardy, Leon Roppolo, and Santo Pecora, in addition to the pianist aand songwriter Al Siegel. However, the act received criticism due to the perception that the shimmy was immoral. With guardians of public morals speaking out against the dance and other "modern dances", at least one theatre is said to have canceled the show.

Palmer continued to appear on Broadway throughout the 1920s. She starred in the Passing Show of 1924 at the Winter Garden and performed with Paul Whiteman at Carnegie Hall in 1928. By the mid-1930s, Palmer had faded from public attention.

== Recording career ==
Palmer recorded several early jazz songs.

- "When Alexander Takes his Ragtime Band to France" (Victor, 1918)
- "After You've Gone" (Victor, 1919)
- "I'm the Jazz Baby" (Victor, 1919)
- "I'll See You in My Dreams" (Victor, 1925)
- "Sweet Georgia Brown" (Victor, 1925)
- "I'm Coming, Virginia" (Victor, 1928)
- "At Half-past Nine" (Columbia, 1918)
- "Don't Leave Me, Daddy" (Columbia, 1929)
- "Singin' the Blues" (Columbia, 1929)

In 1930, Palmer co-wrote the song "Please Don't Talk About Me When I'm Gone" with Sidney Clare and Sam H. Stept. Many singers later covered the tune, including Frank Sinatra, Ethel Waters, and Willie Nelson.

== Personal life ==
Palmer married and divorced at least twice: Albert Siegel (married 1921, divorced 1928) and Sol "Sonny" Taubin (married 1942, divorced ca. 1951). Palmer told the press in 1933 that she had married pianist Jack Fina, but Fina denied the report, calling it "embarrassing".

In 1921, Palmer's then-husband, Al Siegel, filed a lawsuit against boxing champion Jack Dempsey for "alienation of his wife's affection". Palmer denied any indiscretion, saying "Al Siegel is a cheap piano player whom I picked out of the gutter and married". Dempsey also denied an affair, claiming the suit was "the scheme of two cheap vaudeville performers for publicity".

== Later years and death ==
Little is known about Palmer's later years. She died on December 22, 1967, in New York City and was buried in Cedar Park Cemetery, Calumet Township, Illinois.
