= Del Rey (band) =

- Origin: Chicago, Illinois
- Genres: Post-rock
- Years active: 1997–present
- Labels: My Pal God Records
- Members: Eben English, Chris Cowgill, Damien Burke, Michael Johnson, Jason Ward
- Website: dlry.net

Del Rey is an American instrumental post-rock band from Chicago.

== History ==
Del Rey was founded in 1997 after two of its members, Eben English and Damien Burke, moved from Maine to Chicago. The group added drummer Mike Johnson in 1998 and bassist Chris Cowgill in 2003, and began playing instrumental music partly because none of the members were adept vocalists. Del Rey's first full-length album, Speak it Not Aloud, was released in 2001 on My Pal God Records, and its melding of jazz and alternative rock drew comparisons to fellow Chicago band Tortoise. Darkness & Distance followed in 2003, also on My Pal God. The group kept a weekly rehearsal space in Chicago's Humboldt Park neighborhood from 2005 to 2009, but left it after a robber stole several of their instruments in October 2009. Their fourth album, Immemorial, was issued in 2010, and featured use of Asian instruments such as guzhengs and taiko drums. This album saw the band's greatest commercial success come as an accident; in late 2011, the band was routinely confused by German shoppers on Amazon.de for the singer Lana Del Rey as her songs climbed the German charts. The album repeatedly entered Amazon.de's top-sellers list, at one point becoming the online retailer's seventh-best-selling album in Germany. The label that released Immemorial, Golden Antenna, re-pressed the album to meet demand as singles from Lana Del Rey's Born to Die became Europe-wide hits.

== Members ==
- Eben English - guitar (1997–present)
- Damien Burke - guitar (1997–present)
- Michael Johnson - drums (1998–present)
- Chris Cowgill - bass (2003–present)
- Jason Ward - multiple instruments, production (2001–present)

== Discography ==
- DLRY (Dirigible Recordings, 1999)
- Speak it Not Aloud (My Pal God Records, 2001)
- Darkness & Distance (My Pal God Records, 2003)
- A Pyramid for the Living (My Pal God Records, 2006)
- Immemorial (Golden Antenna Records, 2010)
- The Backbone of Night (Self-released, 2017)
