= Comedy Minus One =

American independent record label

- Founded: 2007
- Founder: Jon Solomon
- Genre: Noise rock; post-hardcore; indie rock
- Country of origin: U.S.
- Location: Princeton, New Jersey
- Official website: www.comedyminusone.com

Comedy Minus One is an independent record label based in Princeton, New Jersey. It was founded in 2007 by Jon Solomon. Comedy Minus One picks up where an earlier Solomon label - My Pal God Records - left off, but with a more focused remit. The label, which takes its name from the 1973 Albert Brooks record of the same name, has so far concentrated on the output of a small group of post-hardcore and noise rock bands, but has also provided a distribution outlet for some previous releases.

== Artists ==
- Bottomless Pit
- The Crust Brothers
- Edsel
- Eleventh Dream Day
- Joel RL Phelps
- The Karl Hendricks Trio
- Obits
- Oxford Collapse
- The Rutabega
- Silkworm
- SAVAK
- Tre Orsi

== Releases ==
Release Number	Artist	Title	Format
001	Bottomless Pit	Hammer of the Gods	CD
002	The Karl Hendricks Trio	The World Says	Download
003	The Karl Hendricks Rock Band	Buick Electra	Download
004	Oxford Collapse	The Hann-Byrd EP	12" vinyl EP
005	Bottomless Pit	Congress	Download
006	Silkworm	Libertine	Download
007	Silkworm	Chokes!	LP/Download
008	Tim Midgett	It Goes Like This	Download
009	Ein Heit	The Lightning and The Sun	Download
010	The Crust Brothers	Marquee Mark	Download
011	The Karl Hendricks Trio	A Gesture of Kindness	Download
012	Obits	One Cross Apiece/Put It In Writing	Download
013	Obits	I Can't Lose/Military Madness	Download
014	Rebecca Gates	Reissuer By: Ruby Series Revisited	CD
015	Bottomless Pit	Blood Under The Bridge	CD/Download
016	Tre Orsi	Devices + Emblems	Downloads
017	Edsel	The Everlasting Belt Co.	Download
018	Edsel	Detroit Folly	Download
019	Silkworm	Libertine	2x12"+CD/Download
020	Joel RL Phelps and the Downer Trio	3	Download
021	The Karl Hendricks Trio	The Adult Section	12" vinyl LP+CD/Download
022	Bottomless Pit	Lottery 2005-2012	Download
023	Edsel	The Techniques of Speed Hypnosis	Download
024	Joel RL Phelps	Warm Springs Night	Download
025	Eleventh Dream Day	New Moodio	12" Vinyl LP/Download
026	Bottomless Pit	Shade Perennial	12" Vinyl LP+CD/Download
027	Minutes	Roland	LP/Download
028	TV Colours	Purple Skies, Toxic River	LP/Download
029	Mint Mile	In Season & Ripe	12"/Download
030	Joel RL Phelps and the Downer Trio	The Downer Trio	Download
031	Joel RL Phelps and the Downer Trio	Blackbird	Download
032	Joel RL Phelps and the Downer Trio	Inland Empires	Download
033	Joel RL Phelps and the Downer Trio	Tradition	Download
034	Joel RL Phelps and the Downer Trio	Customs	Download
035	SAVAK	Best of Luck In Future Endeavors	Lp/Cd/Download
036	The Rutabega	Unreliable Narrator	Lp/Download
037	Mint Mile	The Bliss Point	12"/Download
038	Silkworm	In The West	2x12"+CD/Download
040	OUT	Swim Buddies	Lp/Download
041	Andrew Cohen & Light Coma	Unreality	Lp/Download
042	The Gotobeds	Fucking in the Future +5	Lp/Download
043	Mint Mile	Heartroller	12"/Download
044	OUT	Billie	Lp/Download
046	Hurry Up	Dismal Nitch	Lp/Download
047	The Rutabega	Leading Up To	Lp/Download
048	Deep Tunnel Project	S/T	Lp/Cd/Download
050	Mint Mile	Ambertron	2xLp/Download
051	Eleventh Dream Day	Since Grazed	2xLp/Download
054	Silkworm	Firewater	2xLP+CD
054	Mint Mile	Roughrider	Lp/Download
055	Kinski	Stumbledown Terrace	LP/Download
057	Silkworm	Developer	2xLp+CD
061	Mint Mile	Andwhichstray	LP/Download

== See also ==
- List of record labels
