= Del Ray (magician) =

American magician

Del Ray (c. 1927 – November 18, 2003) was a professional American magician.
