= Bottomless Pit (band) =

Chicago indie rock band

- Origin: Chicago, Illinois, United States
- Genres: Indie rock
- Years active: 2005–2014
- Label: Comedy Minus One
- Members: Andy Cohen (vocals, guitar); Tim Midyett (vocals, baritone guitar); Chris Manfrin (drums); Brian Orchard (bass guitar)
- Website: Official Site, Official Myspace

Bottomless Pit were an indie rock band from Chicago. Guitarist Andy Cohen and baritone guitarist Tim Midyett, both formerly of Silkworm, formed the band with drummer Chris Manfrin of Seam and bassist Brian Orchard of .22 in 2005. Since inception the group has issued three critically acclaimed records and toured in the United States and Canada. The band also played one show in Paris to open the Villette Sonique Festival in June 2008 at the invitation of fellow Chicago-based rock trio Shellac.

Their debut album Hammer of the Gods earned favorable reviews from various music publications. The album was in part recorded at Electrical Audio studios by Greg Norman and initially self-released on 45 rpm vinyl. Notably, the vinyl record also included a copy of the album on compact disc for convenience. The following EP, entitled Congress, was also released in this format. Both releases are available for digital download from New Jersey–based label Comedy Minus One.

On January 26, 2010, the band announced via their Facebook page that their next LP, Blood Under the Bridge, had been completed and would be mastered in March and released August 10, 2010. In March, four songs from the album, "38 Souls", "Q.E.D.", "Winterwind", and "Summerwind" were uploaded to the Internet (the former two songs on Facebook and the latter two songs on their Myspace).

A third full-length titled Shade Perennial was released via Comedy Minus One on October 29, 2013.

Bottomless Pit announced an indefinite hiatus in 2014, with Midyett forming Mint Mile soon thereafter.

== Discography ==
- Hammer of the Gods LP (2007, Comedy Minus One)
- Congress EP (2008, Comedy Minus One)
- Blood Under the Bridge LP (2010, Comedy Minus One)
- Shade Perennial LP (2013, Comedy Minus One)
