= Shimmy =

Type of dance

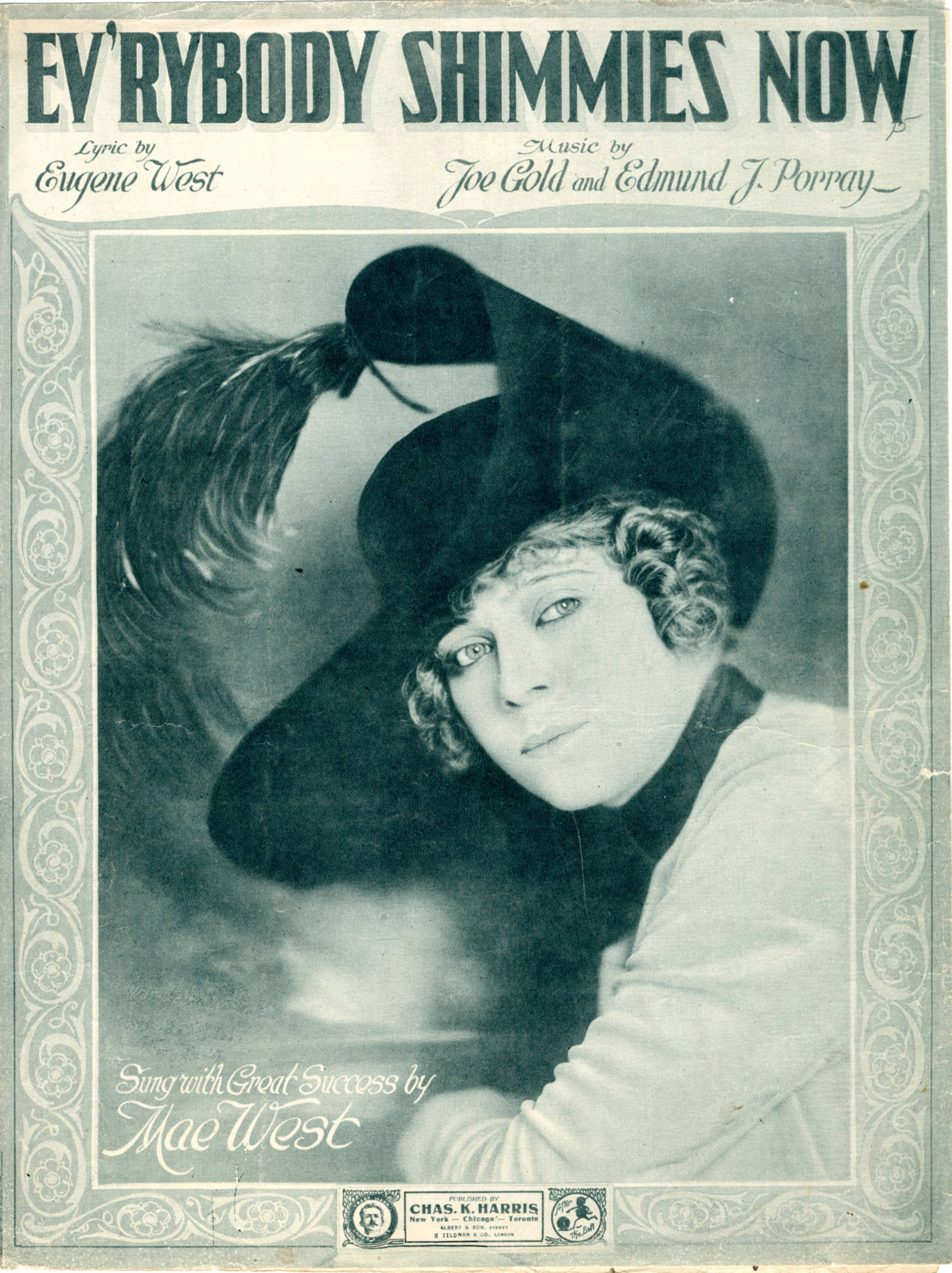
1918 sheet music "Everybody Shimmies Now" with Mae West

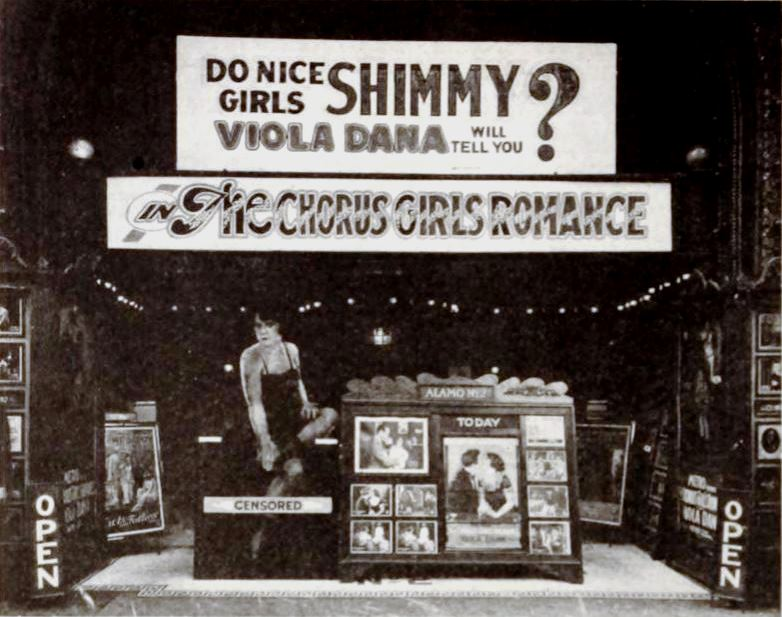
When the Alamo Theater in Atlanta used a cutout display of Viola Dana with separately mounted shoulders and a mechanism to do a shimmy for the film The Chorus Girl's Romance (1920), the chief of police ordered the mechanism turned off.

A shimmy or shoulder shakes is a dance move in which the body is held still, except for the shoulders, which are quickly alternated back and forth. When the right shoulder goes back, the left one comes forward.

== United States ==
In 1917, a dance-song titled "Shim-Me-Sha-Wabble" by Spencer Williams was published, as "The Jazz Dance", which included the "Shimmy-She", among others.

Gilda Gray attributed to American Indians in a 1919 interview with Variety saying: "You may not believe it but the original shimmy dance has never been properly introduced in New York. I know, for I have studied the dancing characteristics of the Indians for a long time, and they are really responsible for the shimmy which they labelled the 'Shima Shiwa'. There have been continual efforts on the part of this dancer and that one, with each declaring that his or her version is the 'original'. There is no doubt but that the shimmy dance as it was constructed by the American Indian would have a greater popularity if done right."

"I Wish I Could Shimmy Like My Sister Kate" was an up-tempo jazz dance song, written by Clarence Williams and Armand Piron, and published in 1919, which has been popular ever since and performed and recorded by many artists.

Flappers often performed the dance in the 1920s. The origin of the name is often falsely attributed to Gilda Gray, a Polish emigrant to America. An anecdote says that when she was asked about her dancing style, she answered, in heavy accent, "I'm shaking my chemise". In an interview Gilda denied having said this, and earlier usages of the word are recorded. In the late 1910s, others were also attributed as being the "inventor" of the shimmy, including Hilda Ferguson, Bee Palmer and the jazz duo Frank Hale and Signe Paterson. Mae West, in her autobiography Goodness Had Nothing to Do with It, claimed to have re-titled the "Shimmy-Shawobble" as the Shimmy, after seeing the moves in some black nightclubs.

The dance was often considered to be obscene and was frequently banned from American dance halls during the 1920s.

In the early 1960s, several dance songs featuring the Shimmy became hits, including Bobby Freeman's "Shimmy, Shimmy", the Olympics' "Shimmy Like Kate", and Little Anthony & the Imperials' "Shimmy Shimmy Ko-ko Bop".

== Folk dance traditions ==
The move is known in Romani dances, done by female dancers to produce a chime of costume decorations made of sewn-on coins.

Shoulder shakes is a characteristic attribute of the Ethiopian eskista dance. In fact, "eskista" means "dancing shoulders" in Amharic.

In Bukusu culture (East Africa), the "kamabeka" dance involves vigorous shaking of shoulders.

== Sources ==
- "Vaudeville Volleys," Variety, July 8, 1919, p. 1055.
