= Windsor Raceway =

Racing track in Windsor, Ontario

Coordinates: 42.25956°N 83.079897°W

Windsor Raceway was a standardbred harness racing track located in Windsor, Ontario. The track was 5/8 of a mile in length. The facility closed August 31, 2012.

The inaugural race took place on October 22, 1965, with Castle Direct driven by Fred Roloson, the first horse to ever cross the line with a time of 2:10. Opening day attendance was 5,136 persons. $194,204 in total wagers. The founders were Lawrence LoPatin and Al Siegel. The underwriter was Armstrong Jones and Company Thomas W Itin CEO. Oct 1964 CA$3,150,000 offering. Total cost was approximately CA$7,000,000.

Windsor Raceway never had a losing year. The track served both the thoroughbred and standardbred interests until the late seventies when the track was upgraded from a relatively flat tartan surface to the banked corner, spiral graded limestone surface.

In 2012, the Ontario Lottery and Gaming Corporation (OLG) removed its slot machines from the facility, deemed too close to its casino operations in Windsor. The track could not make any arrangements with OLG or the Government of Ontario for funding to make up the shortfall and closed its doors on August 31, 2012. The contents were sold at auction in 2013 and the facility was demolished in 2015.
