= Silkworm (band) =

American rock band

- Origin: Missoula, Montana, U.S.
- Genre: Indie rock
- Years active: 1987–2005, 2024-present
- Labels: Temporary Freedom; C/Z; El Recordo; Matador; Touch and Go; 12XU; Comedy Minus One
- Spinoffs: Bottomless Pit
- Members: Joel RL Phelps; Andy Cohen; Tim Midyett; Jeff Panall
- Past members: Matt Kadane; Ben Koostra; Michael Dahlquist
- Website: www.silkworm.net

Silkworm is an American indie rock band active from 1987 to 2005 and from 2024 onward whose core members are Tim Midyett, Andy Cohen, and formerly, Michael Dahlquist.

== History ==
=== Origins: 1985–1987 ===
Founding members Tim Midyett (formerly Midgett), Joel RL Phelps, and Andy Cohen began writing and performing under the name Ein Heit in Missoula, Montana from 1985 to 1987. In 1987, they adopted the name Silkworm.

=== Relocation: 1987–2004 ===
They relocated to Seattle in 1990, where they met drummer Michael Dahlquist. During a radio interview on WNUR at Northwestern University, Steve Albini called in to contact the band. Albini had attended Hellgate High School, the same high school that Phelps, Midyett, and Cohen attended in Missoula, Montana. This connection led to Albini recording the band's album In the West. Silkworm would record with Albini multiple times over the course of their career after this. Phelps left the band in 1994 due to mental health issues and the rigors of touring. The band would soon sign with Matador Records for the release of their album Firewater in 1996. For the release of 1998's Blueblood the band had moved to Touch & Go Records, which would put out all of the band's albums for the rest of their career.

Matt Kadane of Bedhead and The New Year played keyboards on Italian Platinum and It'll Be Cool.

=== Breakup: 2005 ===
Drummer Michael Dahlquist was killed on July 14, 2005, when his car was rammed from behind. Friends Douglas Meis (Exo, the Dials) and John Glick (Returnables) were also killed in the crash.

=== Later projects: 2005–present ===
Shortly after Dahlquist's death, Midyett and Cohen went on to form Bottomless Pit. The band recorded and toured until they announced an indefinite hiatus in 2014.

A feature-length documentary, Couldn't You Wait? The Story of Silkworm, was released in February 2013, featuring interviews with Jeff Tweedy, Steve Albini, Stephen Malkmus, Gerard Cosloy, Clint Conley, and others.

A remastered and expanded 2x12" + CD edition of the third Silkworm album Libertine including the group's "Marco Collins Sessions" and two additional tracks was issued by the label Comedy Minus One in May 2014.

On July 27, 2024, the band reunited for a tribute concert in honor of Albini after his sudden passing. The lineup was Midyett, Cohen, and Phelps (playing with the band for the first time since leaving in 1994), with Jeff Panall of Songs: Ohia & Mint Mile on drums.

A remastered and expanded 2x12" edition of the fifth Silkworm album Developer including five Japan-only bonus tracks was announced by Comedy Minus One for release in early 2025. Shortly after the band announced their first tour since breaking up in 2005. The band began a tour of the US in May 2026, with the same lineup as the one that played at the Albini tribute concert.

On December 4, 2026 Comedy Minus One will issue a remastered and expanded 2xLP + CD edition of Firewater including six bonus tracks.

== Discography ==
=== Studio albums ===
- L'ajre (1992)
- In The West (1994)
- Libertine (1994)
- Firewater (1996)
- Developer (1997)
- Blueblood (1998)
- Lifestyle (2000)
- Italian Platinum (2002)
- It'll Be Cool (2004)

=== Compilations ===
- Even A Blind Chicken Finds A Kernel of Corn Now And Then: 1990-1994 (1998, Matador Records)

=== Singles and EPs ===
- Advantage demo cassette (self-released, 1988)
- Girl Harbrr demo cassette (self-released, 1989)
- "Slipstream" b/w "Inside Outside" 7" (Punchdrunk, 1991)
- "The Chain" b/w "Our Secret" 7" (Temporary Freedom, 1992)
- "Violet" b/w "Around A Light" 7" (Blatant, 1993)
- His Absence Is A Blessing 12" EP (Stampede, 1993)
- "In The Bleak Midwinter" b/w Engine Kid's "The Little Drummer Boy" (split Christmas single, C/Z, 1993)
- "Into The Woods" b/w "Incaduce California" 7" (Rockamundo, 1993)
- "Couldn't You Wait" b/w "The Grand Tour" 7" (Matador, 1995)
- "The Marco Collins Session" 7"/CD EP
- "Quicksand" b/w "On The Road, One More Time" 7" (My Pal God, 1996)
- "Never Met A Man I Didn't Like" b/w "You Ain't Goin' Nowhere" 7" (Matador 1997)
- "The Other Side" b/w "I Must Pianner", "I Must Prepare" 7" (Moneyshot, 1998)
- You Are Dignified CD EP (12XU, 2003)
- Chokes! CD EP (12XU, 2006)
