= Joel RL Phelps =

American musician (born 1966)

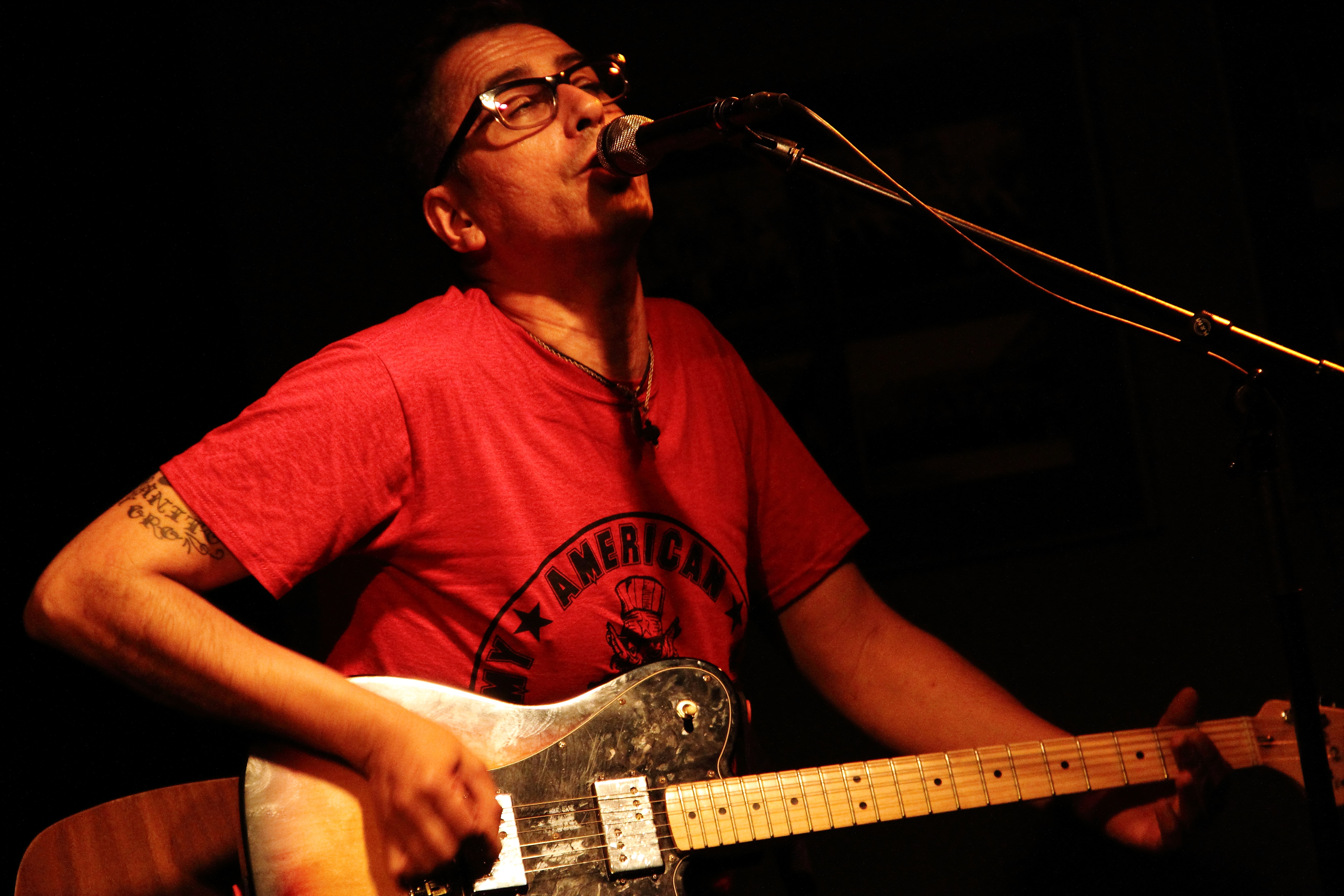
- Phelps in 2014

Background information
- Born: 1966 (age 59–60)
- Member of: Silkworm

Joel RL Phelps (born 1966) is an American musician and songwriter originally from Montana, known for his work with the indie rock bands Silkworm and The Downer Trio.

Phelps has played with Pacific Northwest bands such as Ein Heit, which he joined in high school, and The Wilma Pool. He founded Silkworm after Ein Heit broke up in 1987. More recently he teamed up with G. Stuart Dahlquist, brother of the late Silkworm drummer Michael Dahlquist, to form the band Dama/Libra. He also writes and performs solo material.

== Career ==
Phelps left Silkworm in 1994 in the middle of a tour, and recorded an album in 1995 with members of other bands such as Jessamine, Citizens' Utilities, and the Deflowers. He primarily performed with a trio which was himself, Bill Herzog (Jesse Sykes and the Sweet Hereafter, Earth, Sunn O)))), and Robert Mercer (Treasure State). The band, known as The Downer Trio shares instrumentation with Phelps primarily on vocals and guitar, Robert Mercer on bass, and William Herzog on drums. The group continues recording, and touring, but with much less frequency than in the 1990s when there were tours with Damon and Naomi, and Mark Eitzel. The Trio has shared the stage with many notable acts such as Television, Billy Bragg, Low, Palace, Bonny Prince Billy, Elliott Smith, and Modest Mouse. They occasionally play as The Downer Quartet when joined by Scott Malin. The band was dormant for nearly a decade as Phelps managed and overcame a drinking problem. They released their last album, Gala, in 2013.

== Personal life ==
Phelps is originally from Montana where he says he was "fascinated by the outdoors, by the spatial sense." He attended Sentinel High School at the same time as the other members of Silkworm were at Hellgate High School. He had a sister who died in 1999 who shows up in his song's lyrics. He attended University of Montana in Missoula where he was a straight-A student. He currently lives in Vancouver BC, where he has worked helping people recover from addictions.

== Discography ==
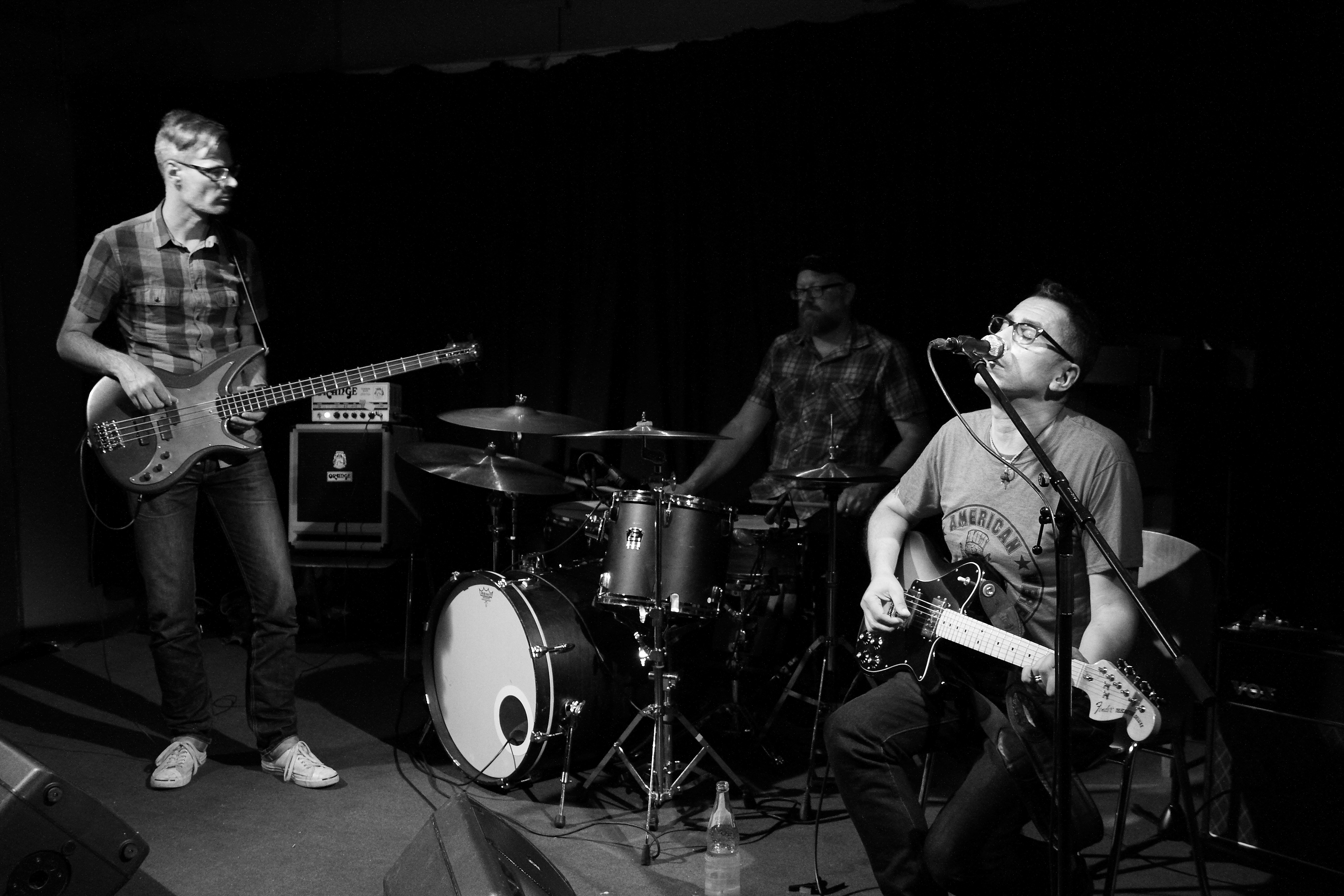
The Downer Trio

=== Solo recordings ===
- Warm Springs Night (1995)
- Spokane Motel Blues 7" (1995)
- Alita Aleta 7" (1996)

=== The Downer Trio ===
- The Downer Trio EP (1997)
- 3 (1998)
- Blackbird (1999)
- Inland Empires EP (2000)
- Customs/Traditions (2004)
- Gala (2013)

=== Dama/Libra ===
- Claw
