= Michael Dahlquist =

American drummer

- Born: Michael Dahlquist; December 22, 1965; Seattle, Washington, US
- Died: July 14, 2005 (aged 39) Skokie, Illinois, US
- Genres: Indie rock
- Occupation: Musician
- Instrument: Drums
- Years active: 1990–2005

Michael Dahlquist (December 22, 1965 – July 14, 2005) was an American musician, film editor, and computer programmer best known for being the drummer of the Seattle-based Indie rock band Silkworm.

== Early years ==
Dahlquist was born in Seattle, Washington, and spent his childhood in the nearby town Bothell, with many vacations spent at his grandmother's ranch in Livingston, Montana. In 1969 and 1970, a nine-month trip to Europe saw the Dahlquist clan live on bread and cheese as they traversed the continent. His childhood was filled with creative endeavors: writing (a lasting passion), juggling, puppetry, and tree-climbing, with a little skateboarding thrown in for good measure.

Dahlquist graduated from Inglemoor High School in Bothell in 1984, and then attended The Evergreen State College in Olympia, Washington. In Olympia, he continued to develop his interests in writing and performance. To the former, he studied literature, mythology and mysticism, including a summer program at the Naropa Institute in Boulder, Colorado, where he studied with poets Allen Ginsberg and Philip Whalen. He engaged in all manner of performance-oriented endeavors, from stage design to participation in and study of Fluxus-style art events of the sort pioneered by John Cage and Joseph Beuys. During this time period, Dahlquist had his first experiences as a rock drummer, playing with the bands Flowers for Funerals and Dungpump.

In 1988, Dahlquist moved from Olympia to Seattle. After a few odd jobs, he found himself a home at Yellow and Graytop cab companies, for whom he drove over the next eight years.

== Silkworm ==
In January 1990, Dahlquist began a personal and semi-professional relationship that would shape much of his adult life. He met the members of Silkworm, three young men recently transplanted from Montana, who were looking to replace their drum machine. He immediately doubled the size of his kit to four drums. Dahlquist was also a member of the Crust Brothers, playing on their 1998 album Marquee Mark.

The activities of Silkworm dominated Dahlquist's life for the next six years. He also became an avid mountaineer and scaled Mts. Adams, Hood, Baker, and Shuksan. He snowboarded, learned to be a swing dancer, and also found time to play with a local gamelan ensemble.

In late 1996, Silkworm began curtailing their tour schedule, and Dahlquist talked his way into a job as office grunt at local software company LizardTech. Six months later, he bought his first house, a tiny one-bedroom on Seattle's Beacon Hill. By the time he left Lizardtech as a product manager in the summer of 2001, he had taught himself Perl, HTML, and XML, and had written the Silkworm website from scratch.

In October 2001, Dahlquist moved from Seattle to Chicago, Illinois. His bandmates had already made this move, individually, but the band had continued to prosper as a long-distance concern.

In Chicago, he was employed at Shure Incorporated as a technical writer, and he continued to spend a great deal of time on Silkworm and related pursuits. However, he also started a web design business and resumed his college studies, as he pursued a degree in visual anthropology from DePaul University.

== Beyond music ==
In the last few years of Dahlquist's life, he made landmark trips to Italy (twice) and Japan with Silkworm. He bought a 2,500-square-foot (230 m^{2}) condominium on Chicago's South Side.

Between late 2001 and mid-2005, he took on the job of editing 145 hours of digital video into a 90-minute documentary film titled "Why Should the Devil Have All the Good Music?", an outsider perspective on the Christian rock music scene. He taught himself film editing from scratch, building a ramshackle Avid system out of home PCs.

== Death ==
Dahlquist died on July 14, 2005, in Skokie, Illinois. While he was stopped at a traffic signal, ex-model Jeanette Sliwinski attempted suicide by intentionally plowing her Ford Mustang into the car he was in. Douglas Meis and John Glick, Dahlquist's friends and fellow musicians, were also killed in the crash.

== See also ==
- List of musicians from Seattle
