= Unsung: The Best of Helmet (1991–1997) =

Greatest hits album by Helmet
- Released: January 27, 2004
- Genre: Alternative metal; post-hardcore; noise rock
- Length: 70:58
- Label: Interscope
- Producer: Various producers; Page Hamilton

Helmet chronology
Aftertaste (1997)	Unsung: The Best of Helmet (1991–1997) (2004)	Size Matters (2004)

Unsung: The Best of Helmet (1991–1997) is a greatest hits album by American alternative metal band Helmet. It contains the band's original trio: vocalist/guitarist Page Hamilton, bassist Henry Bogdan and drummer John Stanier, with guitarists Peter Mengede (1989–1993) and Rob Echeverria (1994–1996).

The title states the years 1991–1997, presumably because 1991 is the year that Interscope rereleased Strap It On; however, it was first released in 1990 on Amphetamine Reptile Records.

== Background ==
The compilation was originally scheduled to be released in late 2003, with tentative release dates of September 23, 2003, and then November 4, 2003 being given to the press. When the compilation was first announced on August 22, 2003, it was reported that the band's original lineup would be reuniting for a tour in conjunction with the compilation's release. However, later that month, Hamilton denied reports that Helmet were reuniting. By the time the compilation was eventually released in January 2004, the band had reformed with a mostly new lineup, and work had begun on a Helmet album, Size Matters, which would be released later that year.

The compilation's track listing was selected by Hamilton.

== Critical reception ==
Professional ratings
Review scores
Source	Rating
AllMusic	4.5/5 stars
The Encyclopedia of Popular Music	4/5 stars
Entertainment Weekly	A−
The Rolling Stone Album Guide	3.5/5 stars

Unsung: The Best of Helmet (1991–1997) received a positive reaction from critics. In their December 2004 review, Deseret News gave the album four out of five stars, reflecting, "In six years Helmet laid the foundation for the nu-metal movement that features Tool, Lamb of God, Slipknot and Korn. Helmet leader Paige Hamilton has since reorganized the band, but the classic Helmet will always be the standout. 'Repetition', 'Bad Mood', 'Iron Head' and the ever-popular 'Just Another Victim' (performed with Everlast's band House of Pain) give this compilation some power. 'Overrated', 'Sinatra' and the drawl of 'Milquetoast' will have Helmet fans reliving the glorious past."

Michael Endelman of Entertainment Weekly gave it an A− in March 2004, writing, "Unsung is right. Without this underground metal-punk quartet, we wouldn’t have the subterranean guitar chunk and drum thunder of nu-metal superstars like Linkin Park. Imagine roaring rage delivered with laser-guided precision."

== Track listing ==
All tracks are written by Page Hamilton, except where noted.

No.	Title	Writer(s)	Original album (year)	Length
1.	"Repetition"		Strap It On (1990)	3:00
2.	"FBLA"		Strap It On (1990)	2:40
3.	"Bad Mood"		Strap It On (1990)	2:15
4.	"Sinatra"		Strap It On (1990)	4:31
5.	"In the Meantime"		Meantime (1992)	3:08
6.	"Ironhead"		Meantime (1992)	3:22
7.	"Give It"		Meantime (1992)	4:17
8.	"Unsung"		Meantime (1992)	3:57
9.	"Better"		Meantime (1992)	3:10
10.	"Just Another Victim" (feat. House of Pain)	Helmet and House of Pain	Judgment Night soundtrack (1993)	4:20
11.	"Wilma's Rainbow"		Betty (1994)	3:53
12.	"I Know"		Betty (1994)	3:41
13.	"Milquetoast"		Betty (1994)	3:53
14.	"Rollo"	Henry Bogdan, Hamilton	Betty (1994)	2:38
15.	"Overrated"		Betty (1994)	2:40
16.	"Disagreeable"		Feeling Minnesota soundtrack	3:52
17.	"Pure"		Aftertaste (1997)	3:32
18.	"Renovation"	John Stanier, Bogdan, Hamilton	Aftertaste (1997)	2:55
19.	"Like I Care"		Aftertaste (1997)	3:19
20.	"Driving Nowhere"		Aftertaste (1997)	4:19
21.	"Exactly What You Wanted"		Aftertaste (1997)	2:36
Total length:				70:58

== Personnel ==
- Henry Bogdan – bass guitar
- Page Hamilton – guitar, vocals
- John Stanier – drums
- Peter Mengede – guitar (tracks 1–9)
- Rob Echeverria – guitar (tracks 11–15)
