= Born Annoying =

Compilation album by Helmet
- Released: April 21, 1995
- Recorded: 1989–1993
- Genre: Alternative metal; post-hardcore; noise rock
- Length: 36:09
- Label: Amphetamine Reptile
- Producer: various, Helmet

Helmet chronology
Betty (1994)	Born Annoying (1995)	Aftertaste (1997)

Singles from Born Annoying
- 1. "Primitive" / "Born Annoying (1993)" Released: 1993

Professional ratings
Review scores
Source	Rating
AllMusic	2.5/5 stars
Kerrang!	4/5 stars

Born Annoying is a compilation album of alternative metal band Helmet's early songs, released in 1995 by Amphetamine Reptile. It is a collection of singles, B-sides, compilation tracks, and other rarities from the band's inception in 1989 until they signed to Interscope in 1992. The band did record two songs, "Primitive" and "Born Annoying, in 1993 that were released by Amphetamine Reptile; they are included here.

The cover art is a bronze-colored version of the same photo used on the "Born Annoying" 7" single.

== Track listing ==
No.	Title	Originally from	Length
1.	"Born Annoying (1989)"	1989 ~ A-side of the debut single	6:04
2.	"Rumble"	1989 ~ B-side of the debut single	2:27
3.	"Shirley MacLaine"	1989 ~ demo	6:20
4.	"Geisha to Go"	1989 ~ demo	3:30
5.	"Taken"	1990 ~ Strap It On outtake that appeared on an AmRep compilation 7”	1:53
6.	"Your Head"	1991 ~ from a John Peel session and later as the B-side to "Unsung"	3:21
7.	"Oven"	1992 ~ Melvins cover from a Sub Pop compilation	1:21
8.	"No Nicky No"	1992 ~ "In the Meantime" B-side	2:17
9.	"Primitive" (Killing Joke cover)	1993 ~ newly recorded	3:58
10.	"Born Annoying (1993)"	1993 ~ newly recorded	4:58
Total length:			36:09

== Personnel ==
- Page Hamilton – guitar, vocals
- Peter Mengede – guitar
- Henry Bogdan – bass
- John Stanier – drums
