= Exactly What You Wanted =

Single by Helmet

from the album Aftertaste
- B-side: "Disagreeable"
- Released: 1997
- Recorded: July–November 1996
- Studio: Capitol and Hollywood Sound in Los Angeles and RPM in New York
- Genre: Alternative metal, post-hardcore
- Length: 2:36
- Label: Interscope
- Songwriter: Page Hamilton
- Producers: Dave Sardy, Helmet

Helmet singles chronology
"Milquetoast" (1994)	"Exactly What You Wanted" (1997)	"Like I Care" (1997)

Music video
- "Exactly What You Wanted" on YouTube

"Exactly What You Wanted" is a song by American alternative metal band Helmet. The song was released in 1997 as the first single from the band's fourth studio album Aftertaste.

== Music video ==
A music video was released for the song and shows the band performing the song live.

== Track listing ==
Promo single

No.	Title	Length
1.	"Exactly What You Wanted"	2:36

Maxi single

No.	Title	Length
1.	"Exactly What You Wanted"	2:36
2.	"Disagreeable"	3:43
3.	"Pure" (Wharton Tiers Mix)	3:49

== Chart positions ==
Chart	Peak positions
Australia (ARIA)	167
US Mainstream Rock	19

== Personnel ==
- Page Hamilton – vocals, guitar
- Henry Bogdan – bass
- John Stanier – drums
