= Milquetoast (song) =

Promotional single by Helmet

from the album The Crow: Original Motion Picture Soundtrack and Betty
- Released: 1994
- Genre: Alternative metal
- Length: 3:59 ("Milktoast"); 3:53 ("Milquetoast")
- Label: Interscope; Atlantic
- Songwriter: Page Hamilton
- Producers: Butch Vig; Helmet

Helmet singles chronology
| "Biscuits for Smut" (1994) | "Milquetoast" (1994) | "Exactly What You Wanted" (1997) |

Music video
- "Milquetoast" on YouTube

"Milquetoast" (also known as "Milktoast") is a song by the American alternative metal band Helmet. Released as a promotional single, it is the fourth track on their third studio album, Betty (1994). It is also the only single from the album to chart in the US, peaking at No. 39 on Billboard's Album Rock Tracks chart on July 23, 1994.

Prior to Betty's release, an alternate version of the song appeared on The Crow soundtrack as "Milktoast". The Crow soundtrack's version was mixed by Butch Vig, while Betty's version was mixed by Andy Wallace.

== Music video ==
The music video, directed by Alex Winter, was released in 1994. It features the band along with shots from The Crow, and went into heavy rotation on MTV.

== Legacy ==
"Milquetoast" has been described as an influential song to the nu metal scene.

== Track listing ==
| No. | Title | Length |
|---|---|---|
| 1. | "Milktoast" | 3:59 |
| 2. | "Milquetoast" | 3:53 |

== Credits and personnel ==
=== Milktoast ===
Adapted from The Crow soundtrack's liner notes.

Helmet

- Page Hamilton – guitar, vocals
- Rob Echeverria – guitar
- Henry Bogdan – bass
- John Stanier – drums

Technical

- Butch Vig – production, mixing
- Helmet – production
- John Siket – engineering
- Stephen Marcussen – mastering

Studios

- Power Station and Sound on Sound Studios (New York City) – recording locations
- Soundtrack Studios (New York City) – mixing location
- Precision Mastering (Hollywood, California) – mastering location

=== Milquetoast ===
Adapted from Betty's liner notes.

Helmet

- Page Hamilton – guitar, vocals
- Rob Echeverria – guitar
- Henry Bogdan – bass
- John Stanier – drums

Technical

- Butch Vig – production
- John Siket – recording
- Andy Wallace – mixing
- Howie Weinberg – mastering

Studios

- Quantum Sound Studios (Jersey City, New Jersey) – mixing location
- Masterdisk (New York City) – mastering location

== Charts ==
Chart performance for "Milquetoast" / "Milktoast"
| Chart (1994) | Peak position |
|---|---|
| US Active Rock (Hits) | 8 |
| US College Cuts (CMJ) | 8 |
| US Mainstream Rock (Billboard) | 39 |
| US Rock Tracks Airplay (Radio & Records) | 35 |
