= In the Meantime (Helmet song) =

Single by Helmet

from the album Meantime
- Released: 1992
- Recorded: 1992
- Studio: Chicago Recording Company
- Genre: Alternative metal; post-hardcore
- Length: 3:08
- Label: Amphetamine Reptile
- Songwriter: Page Hamilton
- Producers: Steve Albini, Helmet

Helmet singles chronology
"Give It" (1992)	"In the Meantime" (1992)	"Primitive/Born Annoying 1993" (1993)

Music video
- "In the Meantime" on YouTube

"In the Meantime" is a song from the American alternative metal band Helmet's second album Meantime. It was nominated for the Grammy Award for Best Metal Performance in 1992.

== Recording and production ==
The song was recorded by Steve Albini and later remixed by Andy Wallace. Wallace's style of mixing, which involves (among other things) triggered samples and a cleaner more polished sound, irritated Albini. Later, when in negotiations to record Nirvana's In Utero, he stipulated a clause be added to his contract stating that Wallace would not be allowed to remix the album, after he had mixed Nevermind, which was released nine months before Meantime.

== Music Video ==
The music video follows the band, mostly in black and white, with cuts of both a small child playing with various toys, and women working in factories.

== Cover versions ==
The song was covered by Soulfly on their 2004 album Prophecy, and by Pig Destroyer on their compilation album Painter of Dead Girls. I Am Become Death covered the song for the song-for-song tribute album to the original Meantime album called "Meantime (Redux)" which was released in 2016. In 2018, Lamb of God covered the song and it is featured in the band's cover album Legion: XX (under their original name Burn the Priest).

== Accolades ==
Year	Publication	Country	Accolade	Rank
1999	The Boston Phoenix	United States	"The 90 Best Songs of the 90s"	*
2004	Kerrang!	United Kingdom	"666 Songs You Must Own (Alternative Rock)"	8
"*" denotes an unordered list.

== Track listing ==
=== Amphetamine Reptile Records 7" vinyl ===
Side A
No.	Title	Length
1.	"In the Meantime"	3:04

Side B
No.	Title	Length
1.	"No Nicky No" (instrumental)	2:13

=== Promo single ===
No.	Title	Length
1.	"In the Meantime"	3:04

=== Rock Ahead Records 12" vinyl ===
Side A
No.	Title	Length
1.	"In the Meantime"	3:04
2.	"Unsung"	3:59

Side B
No.	Title	Length
1.	"Better"	3:09
2.	"You Borrowed"	3:49

== Personnel ==
=== Band ===
- Peter Mengede – guitar
- Henry Bogdan – bass
- Page Hamilton – guitar, vocals
- John Stanier – drums

=== Technical crew ===
- Steve Albini – recording (Side A)
- Wharton Tiers – mixing (Side B), recording (Side B)
- Andy Wallace – mixing (Side A)
