= Betty (Helmet album) =

1994 studio album by Helmet

Studio album by Helmet
- Released: June 21, 1994
- Recorded: 1993–1994
- Studio: Soundtrack, New York City; Power Station, New York City; Sound on Sound, New York City
- Genre: Alternative metal; post-hardcore; noise rock
- Length: 41:43
- Label: Interscope
- Producer: T-Ray, Butch Vig, Helmet

Helmet chronology
Meantime (1992)	Betty (1994)	Born Annoying (1995)

Singles from Betty
- 1. "Milquetoast" Released: 1994; 2. "Biscuits for Smut" Released: 1994; 3. "Wilma's Rainbow" Released: 1994

Betty is the third studio album by American alternative metal band Helmet, released in 1994 by Interscope Records. It is Helmet's highest charting album in the US.

The album was highly anticipated by both music critics and fans as a result of the band's success with the previous album, Meantime (1992). Rob Echeverria (guitarist of New York hardcore band Rest in Pieces) replaced Peter Mengede on guitar. After recording and touring in support of the album, Echeverria left Helmet in 1995 to join Biohazard; however, his departure was more amicable than Mengede's.

Prior to Betty's release in June 1994, the album's biggest hit, "Milquetoast", appeared in alternate form on The Crow soundtrack as "Milktoast". Its video was in regular rotation on MTV, and videos for "Wilma's Rainbow" and "Biscuits for Smut" were also released. In 2015, the band announced a Betty tour, where they performed the album in its entirety.

== Musical style ==
Usually regarded as Helmet's experimental album, it features a broader approach with forays into jazz and blues. Frontman Page Hamilton said, "those things were my indulgences. I tried to force the music in different directions. I know a lot of fans were disappointed, but I think it's important to try to grow musically." Helmet's sonic trademarks of crunching riffs and pounding drums still define the album. Betty, along with Meantime and Aftertaste, are considered definitive influences in post-metal.

== Recording and production ==
Helmet entered the studio in the fall of 1993 with producer T-Ray to record the follow-up to its 1992 record Meantime. Writing and recording sessions took place at Soundtrack, Power Station, and Sound on Sound in New York City. Rhythm guitarist Rob Echeverria claimed in 2015 that Interscope's expectations for the album were high, stating "when I joined the band [in 1993], it was right at the end of the Meantime tour, so everything was really riding high. We all got the gold records, the band was really happy about that and it was all good." He also recalls, "I remember going home and sitting for months while Page wrote the record and then us getting together in the fall to rehearse."

== Touring ==
At shows in 1993, Helmet performed early versions of Betty-era songs such as "I Know", "Thick", and "Vaccination". In support of Betty, Helmet went on a 24-date American tour with Rollins Band and the Les Claypool project Sausage. According to Hamilton in 2002, the entire tour with Rollins Band and Sausage was recorded. Other artists that Helmet performed with during the Betty cycle include Beastie Boys, Girls Against Boys, Kepone, Orange 9mm, Primus, Kerbdog, Understand, Quicksand, Today Is the Day and German noise trio Caspar Brötzmann Massaker. At a Connecticut concert with Girls Against Boys and Caspar Brötzmann Massaker, the latter group received a negative reception from Helmet's audience for opening the show with three 10-minute noisescapes. According to a 1994 article by the Hartford Courant, the audience's reaction angered Hamilton, who explained, "we tour with groups we like. Try to open your ears and open your minds."

Shortly after the release of Betty, Interscope's promotional support for Helmet waned, and the band began playing to lower crowds, with Echeverria remembering, "when we'd show up to play on tour, especially in Europe, there was nobody there. So we went from this big high to big lows." The touring cycle for Betty ended in January 1995, although later in 1995 the band ended up going on a small run of American shows opening for Nine Inch Nails.

== Release and reception ==
Professional ratings
Review scores
Source	Rating
AllMusic	3/5 stars
Collector's Guide to Heavy Metal	9/10
The Encyclopedia of Popular Music	2/5 stars
Los Angeles Times	2.5/4 stars
MusicHound Rock	3.5/5 stars
NME	6/10
Rolling Stone	4/5 stars
The Rolling Stone Album Guide	3.5/5 stars
Select	3/5 stars
Spin Alternative Record Guide	7/10

Betty was released on June 21, 1994, and peaked at number 45 on the Billboard 200 album chart, making it Helmet's highest ranking album so far. However, it failed to replicated the success of Meantime, and by 1997 the album had only sold 500,000 copies worldwide. (Note: Betty sold 252,000 copies in the United States, and an additional 250,000 copies abroad.) In their original 1994 review, Spin commented that the album was "yet more of the band’s relentless thump and grind. Guitarist Peter Mengede has been replaced by Rob Echeverria, but otherwise the Helmet machine chugs on without a glitch. This is heavy metal without the theater, head-banging music for people without hair." Lorraine Ali of the Los Angeles Times claimed in her June 1994 review that "sludgy fuzz guitar now engulfs the precision thrashing of Helmet, a New York metal quartet that plays tight, sharp grooves with a maniacal and sometimes experimental urban edge." In his retrospective review, AllMusic's John Franck gave it three out of five stars, writing "label pressure notwithstanding, the album had a lot more riding on it than even perhaps Hamilton was willing to admit [...] Betty appears to be an almost too well thought out affair, and, ultimately, its songs miss out on some of the discreet melodic accents which had served to underpin even the most bludgeoning noise-fests on Meantime."

=== Legacy ===
Despite a lukewarm commercial reception initially, the album has since garnered praise from Helmet fans and critics alike. In 2014, Rolling Stone included it on a list titled "1994: The 40 Best Records From Mainstream Alternative’s Greatest Year", while in 2019 Louder Sound included it on their list of the "10 essential alt-metal albums". Louder Sound state, "their influence on nu-metal is massive yet never really talked about, which could be down to the fact that Helmet didn’t just create in massive concrete block riffs, they also dealt in arty, avant-garde passages of noise."

Diffuser.fm in 2015 called it the most accessible yet most challenging Helmet album. They reflect, "right off the bat, with its pleasantly eerie cover of a filtered photo of a woman kneeling on a lawn in what appears to be '50s suburbia, the third album by New York City alt-metal quartet Helmet announced a departure from the spartan rigidity and single-mindedness the band made famous with their 1992 sophomore effort, Meantime", further adding that, "when Helmet followed-up Betty with the decidedly more direct and stripped-down Aftertaste in 1997, Hamilton almost seemed to apologize for deigning to deviate from his usual formula. Apparently, time has afforded him with some perspective, as Helmet performed Betty in its entirety on tour in 2015. More than two decades later, the album still continues to reveal its charms."

In 2004, the songs "Wilma's Rainbow", "I Know", "Milquetoast", "Rollo" and "Overrated" appeared on the compilation album Unsung: The Best of Helmet (1991–1997). The track listing was chosen by Page Hamilton, and for unknown reasons omitted "Biscuits for Smut", which was released as a single and had a music video. Instrumental versions of "Wilma's Rainbow", "Milquetoast", "Tic" and "Overrated" also appeared on a promotional 2003 release titled The Instrumental Music of Helmet (1992–1997). Covers of "I Know" by Fashion Week and "Milquetoast" by Brief Lives appeared as part of the 2016 Helmet tribute album Meantime (Redux).

== Track listing ==
All tracks are written by Page Hamilton, except where noted.

No.	Title	Writer(s)	Length
1.	"Wilma's Rainbow"		3:54
2.	"I Know"		3:40
3.	"Biscuits for Smut"		2:53
4.	"Milquetoast"		3:53
5.	"Tic"		3:40
6.	"Rollo"	Henry Bogdan, Hamilton	2:38
7.	"Street Crab"		3:31
8.	"Clean"		2:26
9.	"Vaccination"		3:04
10.	"Beautiful Love" (instrumental)	Haven Gillespie, Wayne King, Victor Young, Egbert Van Alstyne	2:02
11.	"Speechless"		2:59
12.	"The Silver Hawaiian"	Bogdan, Hamilton	2:08
13.	"Overrated"		2:36
14.	"Sam Hell"		2:09
Total length:			41:43

Japanese bonus track
No.	Title	Length
15.	"Pariah"	2:16
Total length:		43:59

Limited edition bonus tracks; recorded July 30, 1994
No.	Title	Writer(s)	Length
15.	"Sinatra" (live)		4:46
16.	"FBLA II" (live)		3:29
17.	"Tic" (live)		4:04
18.	"Just Another Victim" (live)	Bogdan, Hamilton, John Stainer, Erik Schrody, Leor Dimant	2:19
19.	"In the Meantime" (live)		3:39

2010 digital reissue bonus tracks
No.	Title	Writer(s)	Length
15.	"Flushings"	Bogdan, Hamilton	2:33
16.	"Thick"		3:05
17.	"Pariah"		2:16
18.	"Biscuits for Smut" (Mutt Mix)		3:07
19.	"Biscuits for Smut" (Pooch Mix)		3:37

=== Amphetamine Reptile track listing ===
Side A
No.	Title	Length
1.	"Wilma's Rainbow"	3:54
2.	"I Know"	3:40
3.	"Biscuits for Smut"	2:53
4.	"Milquetoast"	3:53

Side B
No.	Title	Length
1.	"Tic"	3:40
2.	"Rollo"	2:38
3.	"Street Crab"	3:31
4.	"Flushings"	2:33

Side C
No.	Title	Length
1.	"Clean"	2:26
2.	"Vaccination"	3:04
3.	"Thick"	3:05
4.	"Beautiful Love"	2:02

Side D
No.	Title	Length
1.	"Speechless"	2:59
2.	"Pariah"	2:16
3.	"The Silver Hawaiian"	2:08
4.	"Overrated"	2:36

The album was issued on vinyl (on Amphetamine Reptile Records) in two-disc 10-inch format; this version included additional tracks "Flushings", "Thick", and "Pariah" but omits "Sam Hell".

A limited edition CD was released with a blue jewel case and five extra live tracks recorded July 30, 1994, in Los Angeles. The live tracks are "Sinatra", "FBLA II", "Tic", "Just Another Victim", and "In the Meantime". (These tracks were released overseas on the Wilma's Rainbow CD EP.)

In 2010, a 19-track digital only reissue of Betty was released. It included the bonus tracks "Flushings", "Thick", "Pariah", "Biscuits for Smut (Mutt Mix)", and "Biscuits for Smut (Pooch Mix)".

In 2024, a 30-year anniversary edition of Betty was released, including the bonus tracks "Flushings", "Thick", "Pariah", "Biscuits for Smut (Mutt Mix)", and "Biscuits for Smut (Pooch Mix)" on a second LP. This edition featured new artwork based on the original, and included an insert of the original cover. As opposed to the original 10-inch Amphetamine Reptile release, "Sam Hell" is also included.

== Charts ==
Chart	Peak
Swedish Album Chart	13
Ö3 Austria Top 40	18
Australian Album Chart	23
Swiss Album Chart	32
UK Albums Chart	38
New Zealand Chart	43
Billboard 200	45
Dutch Album Charts	71

== Personnel ==
Credits taken from the CD liner notes.

=== Helmet ===
- Henry Bogdan – bass guitar
- Rob Echeverria – guitar
- Page Hamilton – lead vocals, guitar
- John Stanier – drums

=== Production ===
- Helmet – production, all songs except "Milquetoast"
- T-Ray – production, all songs except "Milquetoast"
- Butch Vig – production, "Milquetoast"
- Anton Pukshansky – engineering, all songs except "Milquetoast"
- Martin Bisi – engineering, all songs except "Milquetoast"
- John Siket – engineering, "Milquetoast"
- Chris Curran, Anthony Gillis, Joe Hogan, Rich Piszker, Chris Albert – assistants
- Andy Wallace – mixing
- Howie Weinberg – mastering
