= Handsome (Handsome album) =

Studio album by Handsome
- Released: February 4, 1997
- Recorded: 1996
- Studio: Bad Animals, Seattle, Washington
- Genre: Post-hardcore, alternative metal
- Length: 39:40
- Label: Epic
- Producer: Terry Date; Handsome

Handsome is the only studio album by American rock band Handsome. It was released on February 4, 1997, through Epic Records, and was produced by Terry Date.

== Background ==
Handsome was founded by Australian guitarist Peter Mengede, an original member of the New York City band Helmet. Mengede had left Helmet in 1993 over disagreements with the songwriting process, and was in debt due to tax issues.

Mengede recruited former members of New York area hardcore bands Cro-Mags and Quicksand. However, he claimed at the time that the band were "being very cautious to avoid cashing in on this 'hardcore supergroup' label." Vocalist Jeremy Chatelain was discovered by the other members during a long auditioning process in New York.

The band eventually signed a million dollar multi-record deal with Sony's Epic. Their eponymous debut was recorded and mastered at Bad Animals Studio in Seattle, Washington with Terry Date. Prior to making the album in Seattle, they had done a small tour of the midwest with Deftones. It was mixed by Date and Swiss-American engineer Ulrich Wild.

== Musical style ==
It has been described as "slightly more cerebral" than Mengede's previous band Helmet. Drummer Pete Hines, formerly of Cro-Mags, stated in a 1997 interview that, "Because Sony has used our ex-bands as marketing, I think that a lot of people who were into those bands tend to think that we've sold out or something. We knew from the beginning of Handsome that we didn't want to do the same thing -- Peter was tired of doing the same kinda [guitar] licks, and I was tired of the thrash thing. We knew that we wanted a melodic singer over really heavy music." In a 1997 review of a Handsome concert with Silverchair and Local H, the Deseret News claimed that Handsome had much less of a grunge-influenced style than the other two acts, and described their sound as "staking its tent in hard-driving rock territory that flirted with, but never completely embraced, metal and hardcore."

== Promotion ==
It was released by Epic on February 4, 1997, with a black and white music video being made to support the single "Needles". Touring for the album lasted up until late July 1997, and included runs of shows in America with Corrosion of Conformity and Silverchair/Local H. Like Mengede, Silverchair also originated from Australia, and the members were fans of Helmet. In June 1997, Handsome played at the Hultsfred Festival in Sweden, which coincidentally featured Helmet, who were promoting their recent release Aftertaste. However, Helmet performed the day before Handsome at the festival.

== Reception ==
Professional ratings
Review scores
| Source | Rating |
|---|---|
| AllMusic | 3/5 stars |
| Collector's Guide to Heavy Metal | 9/10 |
| Fort Worth Star-Telegram | 4/5 stars |
| Kerrang! | 4/5 stars |
| MusicHound Rock | 4/5 stars |
| NME | 5/10 |
| Rock Hard | 8.5/10 |

Jenny Eliscu, in CMJ New Music Monthly, wrote that, "like the bands from which it is descended, Handsome's chief strategy is to combine dramatic vocal melodies, chugging, tandem guitar lines, and pounding rhythms into brief, catchy anthems." She claimed, "the powerhouse rhythm section could jackhammer through the strongest bulwark, and any of these songs could turn a crowd of shoegazing ne'er do-wells into a writhing mass of moshers." Peter Stepek of AllMusic stated in his review that, "Handsome delivers a distinctive hybrid that is complex and interesting, particularly when, as in "Eden Complex," the band shifts effortlessly from one hook filled section to the next." In August 1998, The Lantern named it as one of the "top unheard records of '97".

=== Legacy ===
Rich Quinland of Jersey Beat stated that the band had "incredible potential but did not quite fit anywhere within the worlds of alternative, metal and the nightmarish arrival of nu metal."

Drowned in Sound wrote in 2018, "this is an album mostly consigned to obscurity. It deserves so much more. It’s just as good as Water & Solutions, Around the Fur or Fantastic Planet, which are probably its closest contemporaries, deservedly recognised as classics in their genre. Yet it doesn’t really sound like any of them. Handsome is its own beast entirely." They add that, "On the surface, it’s a fairly relentless listen, but multiple turns reveal variety and gentle exploration. Riding the punk and hardcore influence is a real love of ambient dissonance, where space is earned through patience and repetition. ‘Left of Heaven’ exemplifies this, beginning with a beautifully skewed verse riff that builds atop thick, ascending chords, then concedes ground to a coarse anti-solo. Singer Jeremy Chatelain adds to the murk with opaque lyrics [and] a detached melancholy. The following song, ‘Thrown Away’ is the sort of song for which Far receive all the credit, but which Handsome perfected first; slashing hardcore spliced to a twinkly chorus, unfamiliar bedfellows only seeking coexistence."

Kerrang! included Handsome on a 2019 list of "The 12 most underrated albums of the ’90s", claiming "Handsome could boast a frontman with an emotional range to rival the very best rock singers of the decade."

In 2021, Louder Sound included Handsome on their list of the "top 50 cult metal bands", and labelled their sole album as an "overlooked alt-metal gem."

== Release history ==
In Europe, the album came with a bonus disc which featured the songs "Closer" and "Spill". "Closer" appears as a hidden track on some versions, and was performed live in 1997.

Handsome was reissued on vinyl in two different editions, through 6131 Records and SRC Vinyl, respectively. 6131 pressed the album on two colors; SRC's version saw the album pressed on 180g audiophile vinyl, mastered for the format with lacquers made by Stan Ricker, inside of a matte gatefold jacket which fits the exclusive 7-inch including the B-sides "Closer" and "Spill". Both reissues were released in mid-September 2013.

In a 2023 interview, Mengede said there had been interest for the band to officially release some of their live recordings, but that they chose not to due to the poor sound quality of the recordings.

== Track listing ==
1. "Needles" – 3:12
2. "Ride Down" – 3:20
3. "Going to Panic" – 3:13
4. "Left of Heaven" – 3:07
5. "Thrown Away" – 3:37
6. "Dim the Lights" – 2:54
7. "Lead Bellied" – 2:46
8. "My Mind's Eye" – 3:09
9. "Waiting" – 2:44
10. "Quiet Liar" – 4:07
11. "Eden Complex" – 3:25
12. "Swimming" – 4:06

European bonus disc

1. "Spill" – 3:17
2. "Closer" – 2:58

== Personnel ==
Adapted from liner notes.

- Peter Mengede – guitars
- Tom Capone – guitars
- Jeremy Chatelain – vocals
- Eddie Nappi – bass
- Pete Hines – drums
