= Aftertaste (album) =

1997 studio album by Helmet

Studio album by Helmet
- Released: March 18, 1997
- Studios: Capitol, Hollywood (Los Angeles); RPM (New York City)
- Genres: Alternative metal; post-hardcore
- Length: 40:42
- Label: Interscope
- Producers: Dave Sardy, Helmet

Helmet chronology
Born Annoying (1995)	Aftertaste (1997)	Unsung: The Best of Helmet (1991–1997) (2004)

Singles from Aftertaste
- 1. "Exactly What You Wanted" Released: 1997; 2. "Like I Care" Released: 1997

Aftertaste is the fourth studio album by American alternative metal band Helmet, released in 1997 on Interscope. It was the band's final album with original members John Stanier (drums) and Henry Bogdan (bass). Guitarist Rob Echeverria, who appeared on Helmet's previous outing, Betty, left the group to join Biohazard. Subsequently, the album was recorded as a three-piece, with Page Hamilton covering all the guitar parts. Guitarist Chris Traynor (formerly of Orange 9mm) came on board for the supporting tour.

Aftertaste harkens back to Helmet's earlier sound, omitting some of the experimental/jazz tendencies of Betty. The album met with a mixed critical reaction from some critics, and a relatively poor commercial response, going out of print in 2006.

== Writing and music ==
Hamilton claimed in July 1997 that his goal when writing the album was to create a greater mix between smarts and crunch:

"I don't want to say that I'm sick of the visceral animal response that we get - I'm not, But I need more than that. I need more than seeing a bunch of kids jumping around and breaking each other's noses. I feel like I really need to communicate with an audience who will listen. I'm painted into a corner. Whatever I write in a rock 'n' roll context will elicit a conditioned response, unless I quit rock and make a country record or something."

In another interview from November 1997, Hamilton said that he and producer Dave Sardy initially wanted to make, "the Helmet-est Helmet album" and "not think about the past or the future or anything, just sort of write Helmet songs." He added that he ended up discovering more about himself as a musician during the recording, and that, "together we came up with this thing that's distinctive and sounds like Helmet." John Stanier said to DRUM! Magazine, "for Aftertaste, we wrote a few of the songs as a band, but as far as the arrangements go, no one tells me what to play. I have complete freedom. I pretty much can do whatever I want, and luckily, everyone seems to like it. Of course we all toss around ideas." During the recording of Aftertaste, Stanier syncopated a solo on "Harmless", and he claims that he had the most trouble tracking the bridge to "Birth Defect".

The penultimate track "Insatiable" is noted for being the heaviest on the album. There was only one known performance of the song in 1997, with its next known performance coming 22 years later in 2019. According to Hamilton, it has almost never been played live since he has difficulty hitting the vocal notes required for the screams.

== Release ==
The album was close to being released in late 1996, and promotional interviews were held (such as for the Visions Magazine 09/1996 cover story), while advance tapes were also sent to journalists. A 1996 version of the track "Insatiable", featuring the same intro that appeared as the final album's intro to "Pure", was released on the German Metal Hammer's magazine CD Offroad Tracks Vol4 in the fall of 1996. The version of "Pure" that appeared on the "Exactly What You Wanted" CD single in 1997 appears to be taken from this early version of the album. The track list of the early version would've held "Insatiable" as the opening track and "Pure" as the album closer. However, the album's release was drawn due to Helmet being dissatisfied with Sardy's mixing, and recruited Terry Date to remix the album. During this time, the band recorded "Renovation" and added a second chorus to "Like I Care".

It was the band's first album to be released after Universal Music Group acquired Time Warner's ownership stake in Interscope Records, although the songs on Aftertaste were still published by Warner's music publishing division Warner Chappell Music, as they had been on Meantime and Betty. The album was released in bootleg form in Canada five weeks before the official release date, which Hamilton estimated lost the band 10,000 copies.

== Commercial performance ==
Aftertaste and its predecessor Betty were considered commercial disappointments compared to Meantime. The album debuted at number 47 on the Billboard 200 chart, and fell off a mere five weeks later. By September 1997, it had sold 100,000 copies according to SoundScan. By 2004, it had sold 132,000 copies. Regarding their relationship with Interscope Records during this period, Hamilton said in 2017, "we didn’t sell enough records for them. Interscope was not the label it was when we signed there. Initially they were so hungry, they were about signing Primus and us and No Doubt, but they got so big so quick that they changed from being a label that was supporting this kind of fringe music that Helmet was. So for whatever reason they didn’t put the same efforts into Betty and Aftertaste, their focus was putting out singles and MTV videos. They put a lot of effort into the Meantime stuff, but the band didn’t get worse after that album; like Betty and even Aftertaste have stood the test of time." Despite the underperformance of Betty and Aftertaste, the band still released its 2004 comeback album Size Matters through Interscope. Hamilton was initially considering a solo project during this period, although Interscope founder Jimmy Iovine convinced him to continue releasing music under the Helmet name. Helmet eventually departed Interscope in 2005 after Size Matters commercially underperformed.

== Touring and aftermath ==
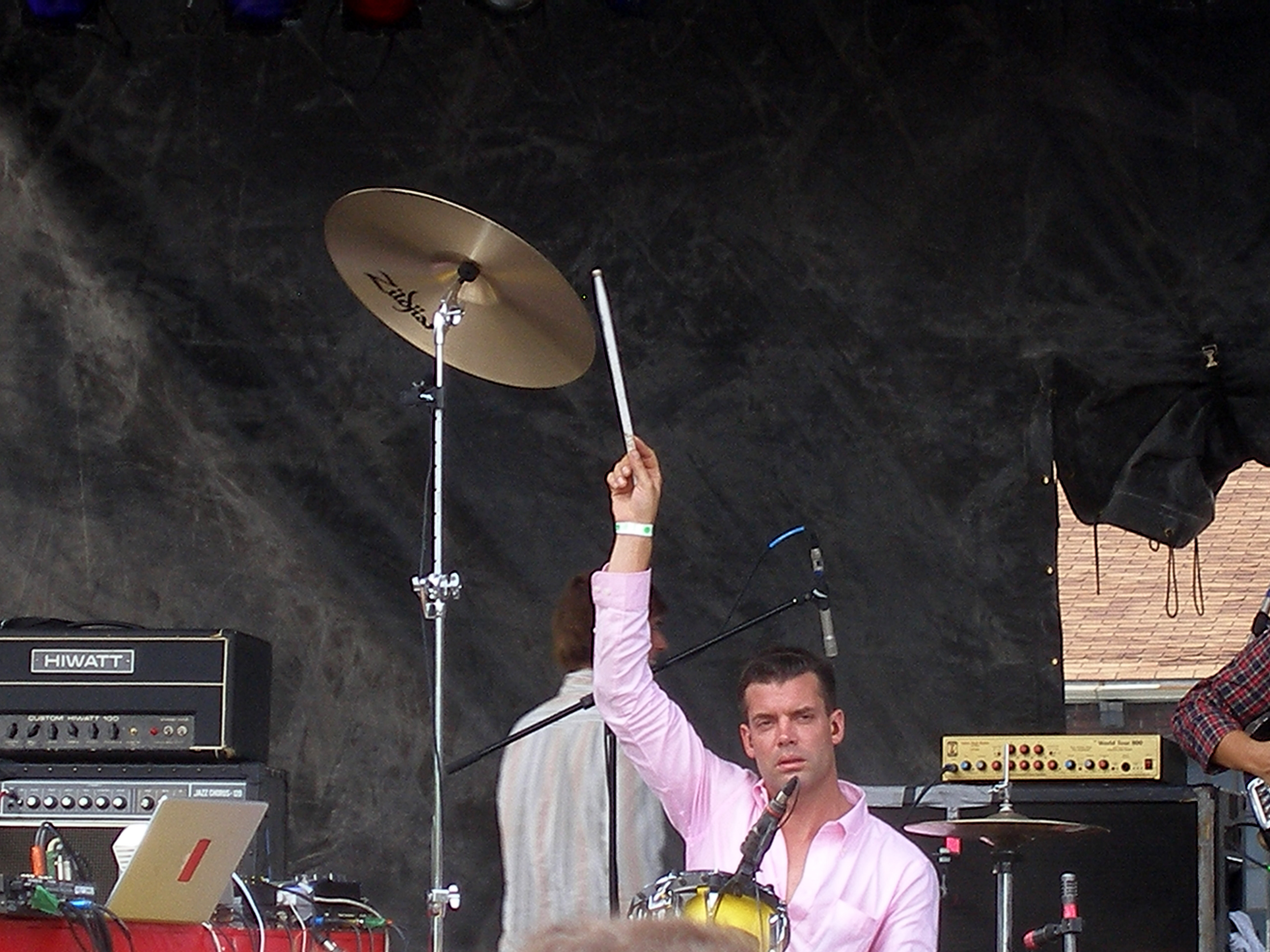
This is the final Helmet album to feature John Stanier, shown here.

Helmet's first shows following the release of Aftertaste were with Korn and Limp Bizkit in North America and Europe, from March 1997 to June 1997. Limp Bizkit's turntablist DJ Lethal was formerly in House of Pain, and had worked with Helmet in 1993 on the song "Just Another Victim" for the Judgement Night soundtrack. Touring for Aftertaste continued through to December 1997, and other artists that Helmet performed alongside during the tour include Coal Chamber, Marilyn Manson, Melvins, Rasputina, Skeleton Key, Australian band Regurgitator and Swiss nu metal band Shovel. On June 13, 1997, they played at the Hultsfred Festival in Sweden, which featured Handsome (formed by ex-guitarist Peter Mengede). However, Handsome performed the day after Helmet at the festival. The run of shows with the Melvins occurred from July to October 1997, and were Helmet's final shows in the USA before their 2004 reunion. Melvins member Buzz Osborne later recalled that his band received a hostile reception from Helmet's fans at some shows. From October 22 to November 1, 1997, Helmet performed seven shows across Australia, and a single show in Auckland, New Zealand. After the Australia/New Zealand leg of the tour, the band went back to Europe for further shows. The band's final performance prior to their breakup occurred in Italy on December 10, 1997. Helmet were inactive throughout 1998, with their breakup being officially confirmed towards the end of that year.

The Aftertaste tour was Helmet's first with guitarist Chris Traynor, who had recently left Orange 9mm. In a 2018 interview, he said he believed that the original members, who were significantly older than him, had lost their enthusiasm for the band at that point. At their final show in Italy for example, Traynor claimed the audience wanted an encore, but that the other members refused. Traynor also recalled crying in a hotel room after a show in Manchester, England, since he knew it was inevitable that Helmet was going to breakup and that he would be left with no other band to play in. While the band never explicitly stated among themselves that it would be their last tour, Traynor claims, "I knew it was over. It wasn't said but you could feel that." Stanier reflected on the split in January 2004, saying, "Helmet broke up and basically it was a really bad break up. It left a bad taste in my mouth. I wanted to get into another band, but not right away. There weren't really any [new gigs] popping up and from a combination of that and just wanting to take some time off, I accidentally turned into a DJ." Stanier along with Henry Bogdan declined Hamilton's invitation to join Helmet's 2004 reunion, Traynor however did join the reunion. At the time, Stanier publicly criticized Hamilton's new Helmet in the media, and over the years has not kept in contact with him.

So far, no live recordings from the Aftertaste era have ever been officially released on B-sides or elsewhere. For the 20th anniversaries of Meantime and Betty in 2012 and 2014, the newer Helmet lineup performed those albums live in their entirety. This did not occur for the 20th anniversary of Aftertaste in 2017.

== Reception ==
Professional ratings
Review scores
Source	Rating
AllMusic	2/5 stars
Collector's Guide to Heavy Metal	8/10
The Encyclopedia of Popular Music	3/5 stars
Entertainment Weekly	B−
MusicHound Rock	3.5/5 stars
Pitchfork	8.4/10
Rolling Stone	3.5/5 stars
The Rolling Stone Album Guide	3/5 stars
Select	2/5 stars
Wall of Sound	68/100

The album was met with mixed to positive reviews from music critics.

AllMusic staff writer Stephen Thomas Erlewine gave the album a negative review, writing "Without the invention of Betty or the gut-level force of Meantime, Helmet is simply a bland alternative metal band, lacking riffs, hooks, and purpose and relying only on volume. It's a shocking and disheartening turn of events for one of the more intriguing metal bands of the '90s." Kevin Templeton, writer for Vancouver music publication Drop-D, remarked in July 1997 that, "Although I consider myself a fan of Helmet's riffs... er, music, I can't help feeling that they could sound a little more dangerous than this." Robert Parsons of Lollipop Magazine wrote in June 1997 that, "Aftertaste brings us back to square one. After a not-so-Helmet effort with 1994’s Betty, Page Hamilton and company come back with full knuckle-busting, abrasive force", also praising the "incredibly tight bass and drums on 'Insatiable' and 'Crisis King'". He noted Helmet's influence on the contemporary music scene by saying, "Silverchair cite the band as a major influence, while both Korn (who toured with Helmet) and Pantera borrow from Helmet’s stripped down metal, open-shut timing, and detuned guitars", and claimed, "for Helmet fans, Aftertaste is a much-anticipated album that lives up to all expectations."

Rolling Stone in 1997 compared it to the Rollins Band album Come In and Burn, which was released the same month, and which would also turn out to be the last album with most of their original lineup. The review remarks, "Helmet's Aftertaste and the Rollins Band's Come In and Burn are prime examples of the '90s brand of paramilitary headbanging. With their drillsergeant demeanors and drill-press riffs, the Rollins Band and Helmet typify this Spartan approach to hard rock." Gabo Ronson of The Daily Eastern News gave Aftertaste four out of five stars in his 1997 review, labelling it a "riff-heavy collection of songs that satisfies the headbanger in all of us." He observed that the album was "pretty much heavy as hell all the way through", but noted that the track "Renovation", "strays from the hard-rocking stomp of 'Pure' and attempts to delve into the world of punk/pop a la Green Day." He additionally wrote, "the one thing I noticed after listening to this CD was the fact that there were a number of mainstream bands out right now that completely rip off Helmet." In April 1997, CMJ New Music Monthly writer M. Tye Comer characterized the album as having "rough, masochistic guitar grooves that pummel with jackhammer intensity." Comer went on to add, "while tracks like 'Driving Nowhere' and 'It's Easy to Get Bored' hint at the melody-conscious outfit we saw on 1994's Betty, Aftertaste is a more direct, more focused and less 'adventurous' outing (i.e. there are fewer tracks to skip over)." Entertainment Weekly wrote that the band, "maintain a metal-machine beat as precise as their crew cuts", but criticized Hamilton's vocals for making the songs "cold and humorless".

=== Legacy ===
The album generally continues to divide listeners of the band, with some considering it comparable to Helmet's earlier work, and others viewing it as the "black sheep" of their original 1990s discography. In a 2004 review of Helmet's comeback album Size Matters, Blabbermouth.net labelled Aftertaste as "okay but somewhat unsatisfactory", and "an album that in some ways sounded as defeated as the band, wracked by inner turmoil". On the album's 20th anniversary in 2017, Diffuser.fm stated that "Aftertaste was less musically adventurous than Betty, going for more crunching, immediate riffing." They also observed that, "The music scene had shifted somewhat dramatically in the nearly three years since Betty, and 1997 would ultimately be remembered for bands like Limp Bizkit and Coal Chamber creeping into the spotlight under the rise of nu metal which, incidentally, was a genre Helmet would end up credited by many to have primarily influenced." Kerrang! commented in 2019, "had they stayed gone it would have made for a fine headstone." Louder Sound claimed in 2019 that Aftertaste, Betty and Meantime were in a "straight knife-fight" for the title of the best Helmet album. Muse bassist Chris Wolstenholme has mentioned Aftertaste as his favourite album.

The songs "Pure", "Renovation", "Like I Care" and "Exactly What You Wanted" were included on the 2004 compilation album Unsung: The Best of Helmet (1991–1997). The track listing for the compilation was chosen by Page Hamilton. Instrumental versions of "Pure", "Like I Care", "Driving Nowhere", "Birth Defect" and "Broadcast Emotion" also appeared on a promotional 2003 release titled The Instrumental Music of Helmet (1992–1997). A cover of "(High) Visibility" appears as a bonus track on Chevelle's 2002 album Wonder What's Next. "Like I Care" was covered by post-metal band Rosetta as part of the 2016 Helmet tribute album Meantime (Redux).

== Track listing ==
All tracks are written by Page Hamilton, except where noted.

No.	Title	Writer(s)	Length
1.	"Pure"		3:32
2.	"Renovation"	Bogdan, Hamilton, Stanier	2:55
3.	"Exactly What You Wanted"		2:36
4.	"Like I Care"		3:19
5.	"Driving Nowhere"		4:19
6.	"Birth Defect"		2:31
7.	"Broadcast Emotion"		2:44
8.	"It's Easy to Get Bored"		3:26
9.	"Diet Aftertaste"		3:16
10.	"Harmless"		2:58
11.	"(High) Visibility"		2:58
12.	"Insatiable"	Bogdan, Hamilton, Stanier	2:31
13.	"Crisis King"		3:54
Total length:			40:42

Japanese edition bonus track
No.	Title	Writer(s)	Length
14.	"Complete"	Bogdan, Hamilton, Stanier	2:50
Total length:			43:32

== Personnel ==
Band

- Henry Bogdan – bass
- Page Hamilton – guitar, vocals
- John Stanier – drums

Guest musician

- Jane Scarpantoni – cello on "Like I Care"

Production

- Ralph Cacciurri – recording assistant
- Terry Date – mixing
- Suz Dyer – recording assistant
- Greg Gordan – recording
- Helmet – production
- Dave Sardy – production
- Ted Jensen – mastering

== Chart positions ==
Album

Year	Chart	Position
1997	ARIA Charts (Australia)	20
1997	Billboard 200 (United States)	47

Singles

Year	Single	Chart	Position
1997	"Exactly What You Wanted"	Mainstream Rock Tracks	19
