= Fryette Amplification =

Guitar equipment manufacturer

- Formerly: VHT Amplification
- Type: Private
- Industry: Amplification
- Founded: January 1989; 37 years ago
- Founder: Steven Fryette
- Headquarters: Los Angeles, California, United States
- Area served: North America
- Key people: Steven Fryette
- Products: Amplifiers
- Owner: Steven Fryette
- Website: Official Fryette Amplification Web Site

Fryette Amplification of Chatsworth, California is a manufacturer of hand-built electric guitar amplifiers, speaker cabinets, power amplifiers, sound effects pedals and pedalboard accessories. The company was founded as VHT Amplification in Studio City, Los Angeles, California by Steven Fryette in January 1989 and was the first to produce a true three-channel vacuum tube amplifier.

== History ==
A few years after moving from Seattle, Washington to Los Angeles, California in 1976, Steven Fryette landed a job as a repair technician at Valley Arts Guitar. Fryette honed his skills doing custom work, repairs, and modifications for the likes of Eddie Van Halen, Steve Lukather, Larry Carlton, Tommy Tedesco, Ry Cooder, Buzz Feiten, Carlos Rios, Duane Eddy, and many other guitar players.

After several years of building experimental prototypes for an all-tube stereo power amplifier and the first in a long line of multi-channel, multi-featured amplifiers under the PITTBULL moniker, Fryette decided to go launch his business. VHT Amplification officially began in January 1989 on the dining room table of a Studio City, California apartment near Valley Arts.

The VHT brand name is still in use by a different company based in Hayward, California. It specializes in affordable quality amplifiers.

== First amplifiers ==
North Hollywood

In 1991, after advance orders for the 2150 Power Amplifier, Fryette then moved to North Hollywood, Los Angeles, California into a converted storefront next door to Bob Bradshaw’s Custom Audio Electronics. Although the company’s time in this location was short, the Classic Power Amp and the first Pittbull Classic Head and Combo amplifiers were launched here.

Newbury Park

In 1992, the company moved to its first commercial building in Newbury Park, California. Many of the current flagship models were launched from this facility including the Pittbull Ultra Lead, Pittbull CL Series Pittbull Fifty Series, Pittbull Forty-Five Series, and the Two/Ninety/Two and Two/Fifty/Two Power Amplifiers. This period also marks the beginning of Fryette’s association with Eminence Speakers, resulting in the development of the P100E, P50E, and P75E 12-inch guitar speakers.

Sylmar

In 2001, VHT moved its operation into the SWR Sound Corporation facility, where the company released the Valvulator GP3 guitar pre-amplifier to accompany its power amplifiers. In conjunction with the development of the GP3, the company applied for its first patent for its Dynamic Sensing circuit. Dynamic Sensing solved the problem of making a stand-alone pre-amp behave more like a tube guitar amplifier head.

Burbank

In 2002, VHT Amplification relocated to Burbank, California. After moving to Burbank, the company designed & produced the Super 30 combo. The Deliverance Series followed, consisting of single-channel amplifier heads & speaker cabinets. The Sig: X three-channel amplifier came next, incorporating the patented Dynamic Sensing Technology.

Fryette Amplification

On January 1, 2009, the company's name changed to Steven Fryette Design, Inc. Under the brand, Fryette Amplification, the company continues to manufacture all of the products that were under the VHT name. The Memphis Thirty combo, incorporating its specially designed AR75 speaker, is the first new Fryette Amplification product release to come out of Burbank.

North Hollywood

In 2010 Fryette Amplification relocated back to North Hollywood, where they developed the Power Station, LXII Single Space Stereo Tube Power Amp, S.A.S and Boostassio Pedals, Valvulator GP/DI Desktop Recording Amplifier, and Aether hand-wired modern vintage amplifier.

== Current models ==
Power Amplifiers

Rack mountable power amplifiers formed basis of the company, with customers such as Metallica, Steve Lukather, Alice In Chains, Anthrax (an American band), and Megadeth.

Pittbull Series

The Pittbulls were the second amplifier series created by Fryette, which includes the KT88 powered 120 Watt Pittbull Ultra-Lead three-channel head (introduced in 1993), the Master Built EL34 powered 100 Watt Pittbull Hundred/CLX three-channel head, the award-winning (2) dual-channel EL34 powered Pittbull Hundred/CL head & its counterpart the Fifty/CL head. The series also included the EL84-based Pittbull Fifty series, the Pittbull Forty-Five series as well as the EL34-based Pittbull Fifty series heads and combos.

Valvulator I

The Valvulator I is a Vacuum Tube Buffer-Line Driver and a Multiple Output Regulated DC Power Supply. It was designed to solve the problems of diminished high-frequency response caused by cable capacitance, decreased signal level and high-frequency response from impedance effects, and signal degradation caused by the design of circuitries in effects devices. The Valvulator I solved these problems using a vacuum tube-based Buffer circuit to transform the guitar signal from high impedance to low impedance.

Deliverance Series

In January 2005 Fryette unveiled the single-channel KT88 powered Deliverance series amplifiers and cabinets. This series includes the Deliverance One Twenty, the Deliverance Sixty, and the Deliverance speaker cabinets.

Sig: X

In January 2007 Fryette unveiled the three-channel 100 Watt Sig: X amplifier, a new design that offers a feature set designed to allow guitar players the capability & flexibility to dial in their own unique or signature sound. The model name Sig: X was in response to the market’s saturation of artist signature model products.

Speaker Cabinets

Fryette manufactures the FatBottom Series & the Deliverance Series guitar speaker cabinets. Both are CNC (Numerical control) milled, constructed with Baltic Birch & front mounted with the Fryette P50E speaker. The Deliverance cabinets utilize the Fryette V-BRACE technology producing a looser feel than the FatBottom cabinets.

Memphis

The Memphis Thirty was the first new product released under the Fryette name. The Memphis also marked the return of combo amplifiers to the Fryette line. The Class A, 2 channel Memphis Thirty 1x12 was the first amp in the new Memphis Series and features EL84 power tubes, 30 Watt & 18 Watt power modes & a unique removable hatch on the front panel allowing users to easily access and change pre-amp tubes.

S.A.S and Boostassio Pedals

Released in 2010, the S.A.S Distortion and Boostassio Boost pedals feature a unique EF86 driven tube design coupled with a variable Bias control to tailor the distortion behavior of the EF86.

Power Station

Introduced in 2014, the Power Station is an innovative product design that couples an adjustable reactive load with an internal 50W, 6L6 power amplifier. The Power Station serves as a power attenuator, power booster, and reamping device with a passive line out and posts load amp effects loop. The internal power amp response can be adjusted using dedicated Presence and Depth controls based on Fryette's original Depth Control design introduced in 1988.

Aether Amplifier

Also introduced in 2014, the Aether amplifier is Fryette's paradigm-shifting take on vintage modernism. In the Aether amp, the preamp, speaker, and reverb unit reside in the speaker cabinet while the power amp and power supply occupy a separate compact lunchbox style housing.

== Notable users ==
- Rob Caggiano
- David Torn
- Page Hamilton
- Steve Lukather
- The All-American Rejects
- Anthrax (American band)
- Blue Öyster Cult
- Pete Anderson
- Rascal Flatts
- Children of Bodom
- Aaron Turner
- Bang Tango
- Dean DeLeo
