= Peter Mengede =

Australian guitarist

- Born: 1962 (age 62–63); Brisbane, Australia
- Genres: Alternative metal, post-hardcore
- Occupation: Guitarist
- Years active: 1978–present
- Labels: Amphetamine Reptile, Interscope, Epic, Sony
- Formerly of: Helmet; Handsome

Peter Mengede (born 1962) is an Australian musician best known as a former guitarist for alternative metal band Helmet. He formed his own group, Handsome, in 1995 with former members of Quicksand, Cro-Mags and Murphy's Law. They released one album in 1997 before disbanding.

== Early life ==
Mengede was born and raised in Brisbane, Queensland. His mother was of Russian descent. Mengede performed in high school cover bands as a teenager, doing covers of artists such as Black Sabbath and Deep Purple. At the age of 16 he dropped out of high school and started playing in local Brisbane bands. In 1981 he moved to Sydney, continuing to play in local bands. He also spent time in Melbourne working at Monash Records, located in the student union building on the Monash University campus. Mengede saved up enough money to move from Melbourne to Los Angeles in the mid-1980s. He eventually settled in New York City, due to his dislike of the Los Angeles music scene. Shortly after arriving in New York, he supported himself through a series of odd-jobs, including working at a video store. Mengede later got hired to work in distribution for the Dutch East India Trading record label, which led to him meeting Page Hamilton.

== Career ==
=== Helmet (1989–1993) ===
Helmet was formed in New York City in 1989 by singer-guitarist Page Hamilton, with the group's lineup being Mengede, bassist Henry Bogdan and drummer John Stanier. They released their debut album, Strap It On, in 1990. After signing with Interscope Records, the group released their second album, Meantime, in 1992 to chart success. The album peaked at number one on the Billboard Heetseekers Chart while it also peaked at number 68 on the Billboard 200. The single "Unsung" also peaked at number 32 and 29 on the Mainstream Rock and Modern Rock Charts respectively. On 18 February 1993, Mengede left the group.

=== Handsome (1994 –1998) ===
Handsome was started by Mengede after departing Helmet. By 1995, Handsome's lineup included former Quicksand guitarist Tom Capone and former Cro-Mags and Murphy's Law drummer Pete Hines as well as bassist Eddie Nappi and Salt Lake City native Jeremy Chatelain. Their debut album, titled Handsome, was released on 4 February 1997 through Epic/Sony.

In support of the album, the group toured with Silverchair, Local H and Less Than Jake in the US, while they supported Wu-Tang Clan and Voodoo Glow Skulls in Europe. Following the completion of their 1997 tour, Handsome disbanded.

=== Recent years ===
After living in New York City for fifteen years, he moved back to Brisbane in late 2001, and started playing with a new band called El Gordo. Guitarnerd published a 2010 article on the Les Paul he used to record with Helmet and Handsome. On 23 June 2011 in Brisbane, Peter joined Helmet on stage for the first time in nearly 17 years and played a number of classics from Strap It On and Meantime.

Mengede currently teaches guitar in Brisbane, and has a daughter, who was born after he moved back to Australia.

== Discography ==
=== with Helmet ===
==== Studio albums ====
- Strap It On (1990)
- Meantime (1992)

==== Compilations and live albums ====
- Born Annoying (1995)
- Unsung: The Best of Helmet (1991–1997) (2004)
- Live and Rare (2021)

=== with Handsome ===
- Handsome (1997)
