= Totimoshi =

American rock band

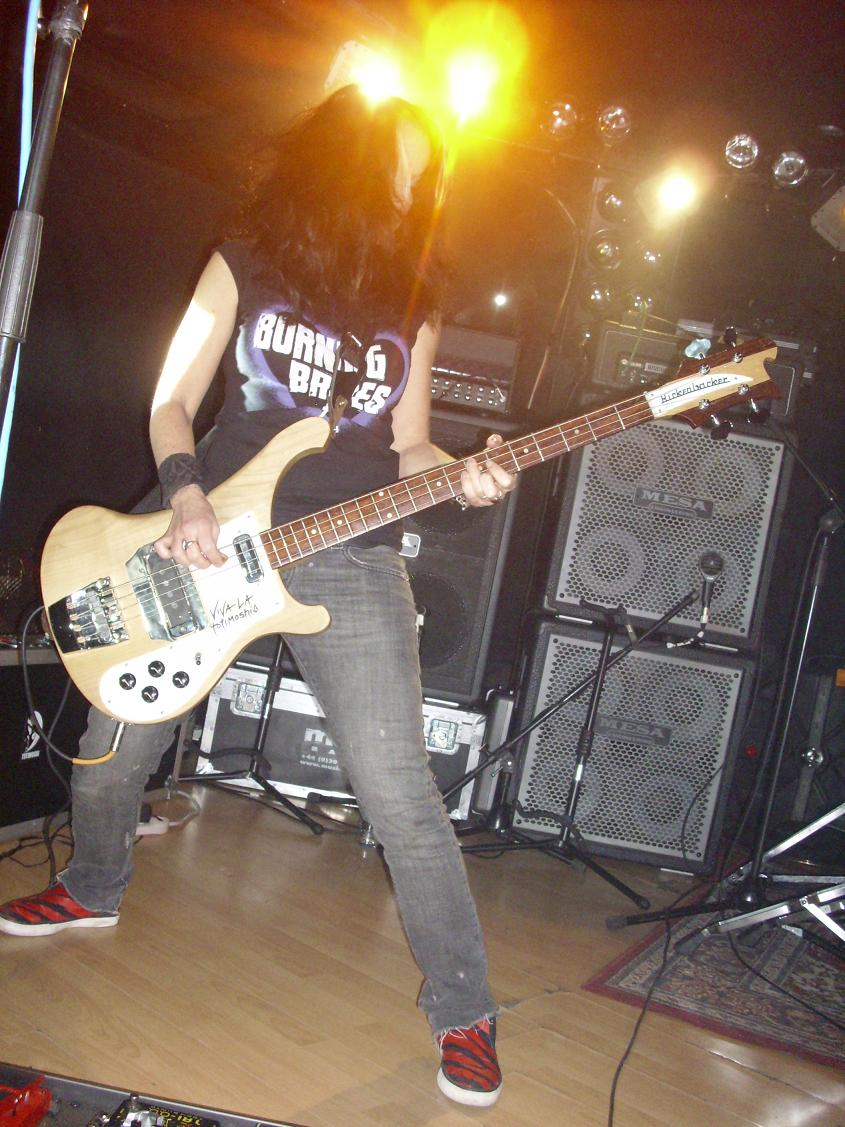
- Meg Castellanos in 2009

Background information
- Origin: Oakland, California, U.S.
- Genres: Sludge metal; alternative rock; noise rock; stoner doom
- Years active: 1999–present
- Labels: Volcom Entertainment
- Members: Antonio "Tony" Aguilar (guitar/vocals); Meg Castellanos (bass); Chris Fugitt (drums)
- Website: totimoshi.com

Totimoshi is an American rock band based in Los Angeles, California. It was founded in Oakland in 1997.

== Style and reception ==
Totimoshi are inspired by artists such as Frank Zappa and Jimi Hendrix; however, the 2008 album Milagrosa borrows more from the band Shellac. Milagrosa, a concept album and stylistic departure from the band's previous albums, is written to the themes of the battle between love and hate, according to the vocalist, Tony Aguilar. It received a 7.5/10 score on Pitchfork Media, and 3/4 from the eZine Static Multimedia.

The 2006 album Ladrón received a 3.5/5 score from Tiny Mix Tapes, and was praised for being "sophisticated" and "patently enjoyable". It was also praised by eZines such as Deaf Sparrow.

== Discography ==
Year	Album	Label	Notes	
1999	Totimoshi	Self-released	Out of print	
2002	¿Mysterioso?	Crucial Blast	Drums by Johann Zamosa	
2003	Monoli	This Dark Reign Recordings	Drums by Don Newenhouse	
2006	Ladrón	Crucial Blast Records, Volcom Entertainment (2007)	Drums by Luke Herbst, Chris Irizarry; produced by Page Hamilton	
2008	Milagrosa	Volcom Entertainment	Guest vocals by Mike Kissam; produced by Page Hamilton and Toshi Kasai	
2011	Avenger	At a Loss Recordings	Drums by Chris Fugitt	Source: Official website
