= Meantime (album) =

1992 studio album by Helmet

Studio album by Helmet
- Released: June 23, 1992
- Recorded: December 1991 – February 1992
- Studios: Fun City, New York City; CRC, Chicago
- Genres: Alternative metal; post-hardcore; noise rock
- Length: 36:56
- Label: Interscope Amphetamine Reptile (vinyl release)
- Producer: Helmet

Helmet chronology
Strap It On (1990)	Meantime (1992)	Betty (1994)

Singles from Meantime
- 1. "Unsung" Released: 1991; 2. "In the Meantime" Released: June 8, 1992; 3. "Give It" Released: 1992

Alternate cover
- Blue cover version

Meantime is the second studio album and major label debut by American alternative metal band Helmet. It was released on June 23, 1992, through Interscope Records.

Despite initially only achieving moderate commercial success, peaking at number 68 on the Billboard 200 chart upon release in 1992, the album influenced multiple bands in its wake, and has been well received by music critics and is considered an influential album of the metal genre. Meantime has continued to sell consistently well in the years since its release, and in 1994 was certified gold by the Recording Industry Association of America. The album has sold over 2 million copies worldwide.

The lead single from Meantime, "Unsung", was a charting success on the US Modern Rock Tracks chart, and remains Helmet's best-known song. Music videos were made for "Unsung", "Give It" and "In the Meantime".

== Background ==
After the release of their nine-song debut album Strap It On, the band found themselves at the center of a major label bidding war, eventually signing to recently founded Interscope Records for a reported budget of US$1 million. At the time, Interscope was a 50/50 joint venture between Time Warner's Atlantic Records and film company Interscope Communications. In the wake of the grunge band Nirvana's recent success, many touted Helmet as the next big thing. Regarding the band's label as "the next Nirvana", frontman Page Hamilton said "They were interested in us before Nirvana even broke. And that's good, because we're obviously not it. I actually had an A&R guy at one label tell us that we were the next U2. At a certain point it just becomes ludicrous." The Guardian reflected in 2004 that Helmet played a "heavier, more metallic" style of music than grunge bands coming out of the Pacific Northwest in the early 1990s. Darren Cahr of the Chicago Reader wrote in 1992, "this is a band that, despite lacking the basic pop appeal that brought Nirvana such a huge audience, crosses all borders." Cahr pointed out that their music was getting played on both Headbangers Ball (a metal program) and 120 Minutes (an alternative program).

"Ironhead" (1992)
30 second sample of the Meantime track "Ironhead".

=== Recording ===
Meantime was recorded by Wharton Tiers on a budget of $25,000. Recording sessions lasted two weeks; Mengede recorded his parts "in an hour and a half or so of a morning." The song "In the Meantime" was recorded by Steve Albini and later remixed by Andy Wallace. Wallace would make additional changes to the album; the contrast between his style of mixing, which involves (among other things) triggered samples and a cleaner, more polished sound (leading to the album's distinctive half-wood, half-metal snare drum sound), irritated Albini. Later, when in negotiations to record Nirvana's In Utero, he stipulated a clause be added to his contract stating that Wallace would not be allowed to remix the album, after he had mixed Nevermind, which was released nine months before Meantime.

=== Artwork ===
The album cover features an image of a man in a white protective suit shoveling some substance on the ground. It is taken from a photograph by David Plowden, "Puddler In Blast Furnace Cast House, Steel Mill, East Chicago, Indiana (1979)".

The album is available with one of two reversely-colored covers; one has a blue background with a white-on-red Helmet logo, and the other has a red background with a white-on-blue Helmet logo (pictured above).

== Touring ==
To support the album in 1992, Helmet opened for Faith No More, a band which, like Helmet, would later be credited with influencing the nu metal movement. These shows came about since the members of Faith No More wanted to have Helmet on their tour. In some promotional photos from 1992, Faith No More's bassist Billy Gould can be seen wearing a Helmet shirt. Later in 1992, Helmet toured North America with metal bands Ministry and Sepultura, where they were consistently playing in front of crowds of several thousand people. During the tour, drummer John Stanier suffered injuries in a road accident, which led to Stone Temple Pilots filling in for Helmet on some of these dates.

In early 1993, the band went on a tour of the Pacific. They played their first shows in Peter Mengede's home country of Australia in January 1993 at the Big Day Out festival. Following this, they performed in Japan and Hawaii. The Hawaii show would be Mengede's last with Helmet, as he departed the band in February 1993, after disagreements with Page Hamilton over songwriting. Their 1993 show in Melbourne, Australia was released on Live and Rare in 2021, which was Helmet's first official live album.

== Reception ==
=== Commercial performance ===
Meantime was originally scheduled to be released in April 1992, being delayed until June of that year. The vinyl release of the album was handled by Amphetamine Reptile, who negotiated with Interscope to retain the vinyl rights to the band.

It became Helmet's breakthrough album, and upon release peaked at number 68 on Billboard's Top 200 Albums chart, and at number one on the Top Heatseekers chart. It also managed to chart outside of the US in 1992, by peaking at number 88 on the Australian ARIA Charts. It is still considered their most commercially successful release and, to date, it is the only Helmet album to go gold in the United States. Their follow-up album Betty charted in Canada, New Zealand and several European countries, in addition to charting at a higher position in the United States and Australia. However, it has sold a lower number of copies overall when compared to Meantime.

Andrew Earles of Spin that while Nirvana's Nevermind largely increased major label interest in alternative rock, Metallica's Metallica (1991) "pointed a fair amount of attention towards the commercial potential of heavier forms of rock, then the surprise success of Helmet's Meantime contributed to the same concern." Earles added that while Nevermind "opened the primary floodgates", the surprise success of Meantime "thoroughly hypnotized Interscope", who in turn "extended the long arm of illogic" far enough to unmarketable albums like Claw Hammer's Thank the Holder Uppers (1995).

=== Critical reception ===
Professional ratings
Review scores
Source	Rating
AllMusic	4.5/5 stars
Chicago Tribune	4/4 stars
Christgau's Consumer Guide	(2-star Honorable Mention)
Entertainment Weekly	B−
Kerrang!	5/5 stars
The Philadelphia Inquirer	3.5/4 stars
Rolling Stone	3.5/5 stars
The Rolling Stone Album Guide	3.5/5 stars
Select	4/5 stars
Spin Alternative Record Guide	8/10

The album received positive reviews. John Franck of AllMusic labeled Meantime "arguably one of the most influential and overlooked rock records of the '90s". He praised the music "colored by Teutonic riffs, with only 'Unsung' hinting at a gasp of commercial accessibility." Entertainment Weekly writer David Browne gave it a B− in his August 1992 review, and remarked, "call Helmet alternative metal. The New York band plays tightfisted speed-thrash, but without the overblown melodrama of the metal scene. ('To die young is far too boring these days,' sings Page Hamilton at one point.) Helmet is fascinating in theory and can crank up the decibels ably enough to have landed the once independent-label band a million-dollar contract with a major record company." Kerrang!'s Steffan Chirazi defined the album as "a wall of angry, bitter and agonised New York street cries", giving it maximum ratings. Metal publication Hard Report wrote in 1992, "one thing that differentiates them from the standard pack of 'next big things' is that there's not just 'buzz' that surrounds this band. It's more like a solid wall of noise." They further noted, "the alternative types have been grooving to them since their debut 1990 release Strap It On. It seems a bit odd that metal never seemed to take more than a passing interest in them until recently."

== Legacy ==
The sound of Meantime, with Page Hamilton's staccato riffs, jazz-influenced chords and solos, and dual-voice singing style, proved influential to nu metal and alternative metal bands. The album, along with Betty and Aftertaste, is considered a definitive influence in post-metal. In November 1999, Iowa State Daily ranked "Unsung" 50th on a list of the "Top 90 Essential Songs of the 90's", labeling it an "alt-metal masterpiece". In 2003, Kerrang! ranked Meantime as 48th on their list of the "50 Most Influential Albums of All Time", while Rolling Stone ranked it 54th on their 2017 list of "The 100 Greatest Metal Albums of All Time". Rock Hard ranked the album at number 157 on their list of the "500 Greatest Rock & Metal Albums of All Time". Alex Ogg wrote in the 2003 book The Rough Guide to Rock that it is "one of the great hard-ass intensity records", and that "parts of it make Rollins look like a lounge singer". Stereogum in 2021 remarked that it featured, "some of the toughest riffs ever recorded". The following year, Guitar World ranked Meantime 10th on their list of "The 30 Greatest Rock Guitar Albums of 1992", stating, "If you were to boldly claim that the importance of the (repetitive) riff replaced the significance of soloing in rock by '92, you could point directly to the sophomore effort by Helmet, Meantime. [Just] listen to guitarists Page Hamilton and Peter Mengede grind it out on such standouts as 'In the Meantime', 'Iron Head', and 'Unsung' – while Hamilton shouts most of his vocals a la an irate drill instructor – to hear the proof." In 2022, Revolver also included it on their list of "20 Great Albums from 1992". They stated that the band "did little to tone down their abrasive sound", further adding that, "single 'Unsung' has its poppy moments, but still culminates in a decidedly radio-unfriendly one-and-a-half minute instrumental outro."

The songs "In the Meantime", "Ironhead", "Give It", "Unsung" and "Better" were included on the 2004 compilation album Unsung: The Best of Helmet (1991–1997). The track listing for the compilation was chosen by Page Hamilton. Instrumental versions of "In the Meantime", "Ironhead", "Give It" and "Unsung" also appeared on a promotional 2003 release titled The Instrumental Music of Helmet (1992–1997). On September 16, 2016, Magnetic Eye Records released a compilation titled Meantime (Redux) that featured song-for-song covers of the original Helmet album by various artists including KEN mode, Fuck the Facts and Rosetta. Additionally, it also included six covers of songs from the band's other original 1990s albums (Strap It On, Betty and Aftertaste).

== Track listing ==
All tracks are written by Page Hamilton.

No.	Title	Length
1.	"In the Meantime"	3:11
2.	"Ironhead"	3:23
3.	"Give It"	4:17
4.	"Unsung"	3:59
5.	"Turned Out"	4:13
6.	"He Feels Bad"	4:02
7.	"Better"	3:09
8.	"You Borrowed"	3:49
9.	"FBLA II"	3:22
10.	"Role Model"	3:31
Total length:		36:56

== Personnel ==
Credits taken from the CD liner notes.

Helmet

- Page Hamilton – vocals, lead guitar
- Peter Mengede – rhythm guitar
- Henry Bogdan – bass
- John Stanier – drums

Technical

- Helmet – production
- Steve Albini – engineering, "In the Meantime"
- Wharton Tiers – engineering, all songs except "In the Meantime"
- Andy Wallace – mixing
- Steve Sisco – assistant mixing, engineering
- Howie Weinberg – mastering

== Charts ==
Chart (1993)	Peak position
Australian Albums (ARIA Charts)	88
U.S. Billboard Top Heatseekers	1
U.S. Billboard 200	68
