= Strap It On =

1990 studio album by Helmet

Studio album by Helmet
- Released: October 1990
- Recorded: 1990
- Studios: Fun City, New York City
- Genres: Post-hardcore; alternative metal; noise rock; groove metal
- Length: 30:49
- Label: Amphetamine Reptile
- Producers: Wharton Tiers, Helmet

Helmet chronology
Strap It On (1990)	Meantime (1992)

"Bad Mood" (1990)
30 second sample of the Strap It On track "Bad Mood".

Strap It On is the debut studio album by American alternative metal band Helmet. It was released in October 1990 through Amphetamine Reptile Records, and reissued in January 1993 through Interscope Records.

Critics considered the album innovative for its explosive, propulsive, and often staccato riff style which greatly exploited drop D tuning. It has since become a cult classic in the post-hardcore genre and even influential on the metal scene.

== Background and recording ==
Helmet was formed in 1989 by vocalist/guitarist Page Hamilton after he left the alternative rock group Band of Susans. Hamilton would recruit guitarist Peter Mengede (originally from Australia), bassist Henry Bogdan, and drummer John Stanier. Having not settled on a name yet, Mengede's then-wife Reyne Cuccuro suggested the Germanic name of "helmuth". Having misinterpreted her, Hamilton thought she was referring to the helmet protective gear. Thinking it was "a pretty cool name for a band", Hamilton went with the Anglicized spelling and the band was named Helmet.

The band was noticed by Halo of Flies guitarist Tom Hazelmyer, who signed Helmet to his label Amphetamine Reptile Records; the band would release its debut 7" single, "Born Annoying", later in 1989.

In total, the album cost $2,500 to make. The album was produced by Wharton Tiers and the band.

== Release ==
Strap It On was released through the independent label Amphetamine Reptile Records in October 1990. In January 1993, it was re-released by their new label Interscope Records.

== Reception and legacy ==
Professional ratings
Review scores
Source	Rating
AllMusic	4/5 stars
Collector's Guide to Heavy Metal	7/10
The Encyclopedia of Popular Music	3/5 stars
MusicHound Rock	3/5 stars
Q	4/5 stars
The Rolling Stone Album Guide	3/5 stars
Select	3/5 stars
Sounds	4/5 stars
Spin Alternative Record Guide	6/10
Sputnikmusic	5/5

The album received positive reviews, with critics praising the band's fresh, raw and innovative sound. In September 1992, the original Amphetamine Reptile release was estimated to have sold 10,000 copies. By February 1995, this figure had increased to 40,000. Amphetamine Reptile Records founder Tom Hazelmyer would later state that Strap It On kept the label going throughout the 1990s.

AllMusic's Jason Birchmeier wrote in his review "The nine-song album is a brief one, clocking in around a half-hour, but even such brevity proves wonderfully exhausting by the time you near the last couple songs. In fact, by the time you make it past 'Sinatra', one of the album's highlights and also the halfway point, slow fatigue threatens as the riffs continue to hammer away unrelentingly and vocalist Page Hamilton's sometimes-tuneful, oftentimes-bellowing shouting grows seemingly further agonized. The overall relentlessness should be a sheer pleasure to those who enjoy the intensity of metal without the clownish clichés yet, at the same time, enjoy the originality of alt-rock without the pansy passivity." In 1994, The New York Times labelled Strap It On as "relentlessly noisy." In 2006, Pitchfork labelled it and Meantime as one of "the metal band's two triumphs." Future guitarist Chris Traynor was a fan of the album, and considered it to be "one of the most important rock records ever."

Kerrang! ranked the album at No. 19 in their list of "The 50 Best Albums From 1990", and stated that the album is "balanced on the centre-point between alt.metal, noise rock and post-hardcore." Stereogum named the track "Sinatra" as one of the "30 Essential Noise Rock Tracks", and the album as "rough-hewn post-hardcore" and groove metal.

In 2004, the songs "Repetition", "FBLA", "Bad Mood" and "Sinatra" appeared on the compilation album Unsung: The Best of Helmet 1991–1997. The track listing for the compilation was chosen by Page Hamilton. The Sacramento-based alternative metal group Deftones covered the song "Sinatra", with it appearing on their 2005 compilation album B-Sides & Rarities. The song was also covered by the band Livver on the 2016 Helmet tribute album Meantime (Redux). The album further included covers of "Bad Mood" by Blackwolfgoat and "Blacktop" by Heads.

== Track listing ==
All music and lyrics by Page Hamilton.

No.	Title	Length
1.	"Repetition"	3:00
2.	"Rude"	4:13
3.	"Bad Mood"	2:15
4.	"Sinatra"	4:31
5.	"FBLA"	2:40
6.	"Blacktop"	3:20
7.	"Distracted"	3:12
8.	"Make Room"	3:28
9.	"Murder"	4:03
Total length:		30:49

Japanese bonus track
No.	Title	Length
10.	"Impressionable"	2:04
Total length:		32:53

== Accolades ==
Year	Publication	Country	Accolade	Rank
1995	Alternative Press	United States	"Top 99 of '85 to '95"	25
1998	Alternative Press	United States	"The 90 Greatest Albums of the '90s"	12
"*" denotes an unordered list.

== Personnel ==
Band

- Page Hamilton – vocals, guitar
- Henry Bogdan – bass
- Peter Mengede – guitar
- John Stanier – drums

Technical

- Wharton Tiers – mixing, engineering, production
