= Unsung (song) =

Single by Helmet

from the album Meantime
- Released: 1991
- Genre: Alternative metal
- Length: 3:57
- Label: Interscope
- Songwriter: Page Hamilton
- Producers: Steve Albini; Andy Wallace; Helmet

Helmet singles chronology
"Repetition" (1991)	"Unsung" (1991)	"Give It" (1992)

Music video
- "Unsung" on YouTube

"Unsung" is a song by the American alternative metal band Helmet from their 1992 album, Meantime. A music video was produced for the song and found significant airplay on MTV in the early 1990s. "Unsung" is recorded in drop D tuning on both guitars and bass, and begins with a bass intro. Its stop-and-go dynamics and catchy rhythm made it somewhat of a flagship of the growing 1990s alternative metal scene. In 1991, a full year before the release of Meantime, Amphetamine Reptile Records issued the "Unsung" 7-inch record (scale 41), featuring an earlier recording of the song.

== Release and reception ==
"Unsung" was Helmet's first single to be released, and was also the lead single to their second album Meantime. The song helped Helmet attain breakthrough success and is their most commercially successful song to date. It reached number 29 on the US Modern Rock chart and number 32 on the US Mainstream Rock chart. "Unsung" was also well received by music critics. Steve Huey from AllMusic reviewed the song positively by stating in his review: "Boasting a stuttering, grinding main riff and the wall-of-noise guitar work of Page Hamilton and Peter Mengede, 'Unsung' was the second video pulled from Helmet's second full-length album, Meantime, and quickly became the band's signature song and an MTV favorite during late 1992. All told, it was probably the single best moment for a band that often emphasized sound over songwriting. 'Unsung' was Helmet at their most focused, alternating between memorable verse and chorus melodies and concluding with a monolithic guitar workout featuring noisy, oddly harmonized chords repeatedly drilled into the listener's skull."

== Track listing ==
=== 1991 Amphetamine Reptile Records 7" vinyl ===
Side A
No.	Title	Length
1.	"Unsung"	3:54

Side B
No.	Title	Length
1.	"Your Head"	3:17

=== 1992 Interscope Records 7" vinyl ===
Side A
No.	Title	Length
1.	"Unsung"	3:56

Side B
No.	Title	Length
1.	"FBLA" (Live)	2:24

=== Promo single ===
No.	Title	Length
1.	"Unsung"	3:56

=== CD single ===
No.	Title	Length
1.	"Unsung"	3:56
2.	"Better"	3:10
3.	"FBLA" (Live)	2:24
4.	"FBLA II" (Live)	3:20

=== 12" vinyl ===
Side A
No.	Title	Length
1.	"Unsung"	3:56
2.	"Better"	3:10

Side B
No.	Title	Length
1.	"Bad Mood" (Live)	2:10
2.	"Distracted" (Live)	3:07

== In popular culture ==
- The song's music video was critiqued in a 1993 episode of the MTV animated series Beavis and Butt-head, titled "Beware the Butt". It also appears in a 2002 episode of WB animated series Mission Hill, titled "Happy Birthday, Douchebag". In the episode, the song plays in the character Andy's room in a flashback scene to when he was a teenager. However, it and all other licensed songs were removed when the series was released to DVD in 2005.
- It is featured in the video games True Crime: New York City, Saints Row 2, Madden NFL 10, Madden NFL 27, the 2004 video game Grand Theft Auto: San Andreas on the fictional radio station Radio X, and in the Guitar Hero series where a cover version is featured in the 2005 game while the live version recorded from a 1992 gig in Chicago appears in Guitar Hero Smash Hits and the master recording appears as the final song of the "Guitar Hero Classics Volume 1" Premium Show on GHTV from Guitar Hero Live.
- It is featured in the U.S. television crime drama The Following.

== Accolades ==
Year	Publication	Country	Accolade	Rank
2004	Kerrang!	United Kingdom	"666 Songs You Must Own (Alternative Rock)"	*
"*" denotes an unordered list.

== Charts ==
Chart performance for "Unsung"
Chart (1992)	Peak position
US AOR Tracks (Radio & Records)	17
US Alternative Airplay (Billboard)	29
US Mainstream Rock (Billboard)	39

== Release history ==
Release dates and formats for "Unsung"
Region	Date	Format(s)	Label(s)	Ref.
United Kingdom	November 16, 1992	12-inch vinyl; 7-inch vinyl; CD; cassette	Atlantic	
