= Rob Echeverria =

American guitarist

- Born: December 15, 1967 (age 57); Corona, New York, U.S.
- Genres: Hardcore punk; post-hardcore; alternative metal
- Occupation: Guitarist
- Years active: 1987–2002

Rob Echeverria (born December 15, 1967) is an American musician who has worked as the guitarist of Biohazard, Helmet, Rest in Pieces, and Straight Ahead. While in Helmet, he helped compose and record the song "Milquetoast", which was released on The Crow's soundtrack. Both of Echeverria's parents were originally from Ecuador.

== Discography ==
with Straight Ahead

- Breakaway (1987)

with Rest in Pieces

- My Rage (1987)
- Under My Skin (1990)

with Helmet

- Betty (1994)

with Biohazard

- New World Disorder (1999)
