= Henry Bogdan =

American musician

- Born: Henry Garnet Bogdan Jr. February 4, 1961 (age 65); Riverside, California, U.S.
- Genres: Alternative metal; hawaiian music; jazz; punk rock
- Occupations: Musician
- Instruments: Lap steel guitar; pedal steel guitar; hawaiian steel guitar; bass guitar; drums
- Years active: 1980s–present
- Label: Interscope Records Amphetamine Reptile Records
- Formerly of: Helmet (band) The Melvins The Moonlighters Hazmat Modine Midnight Serenaders Poison Idea

Henry Garnet Bogdan Jr. (born February 4, 1961, in Riverside, California) is an American musician best known as the original bassist and founding member of the alternative metal band Helmet.

Bogdan was born Henry Garnet Bogdan Jr. on February 4, 1961, in Riverside, California and later moved to Oregon. He started his music career as a drummer for the band Poison Idea. After he left Poison Idea, Bogdan quit drumming and started playing bass guitar. He formed the band Helmet in 1989 with Page Hamilton, Peter Mengede, and John Stanier. Bogdan played bass for all of Helmet's albums released from 1990 to 1997 which included Strap It On, Meantime, Betty, and Aftertaste.

After Helmet broke up in 1998, Bogdan remained active in music but has largely moved away from the hard rock/metal scene. Now focusing on pedal steel and lap steel guitars, Bogdan has made guest appearances in a number of musically diverse bands, including playing the song "Ramblin' Man" with Hank Williams III for The Melvins' album The Crybaby. He worked extensively with The Moonlighters, a Hawaiian steel guitar/jazz band that played very frequently in New York City. Bodgan also played lap steel on several songs on Bahamut, the debut album of the group Hazmat Modine.
