= Helmet (band) =

American alternative metal band

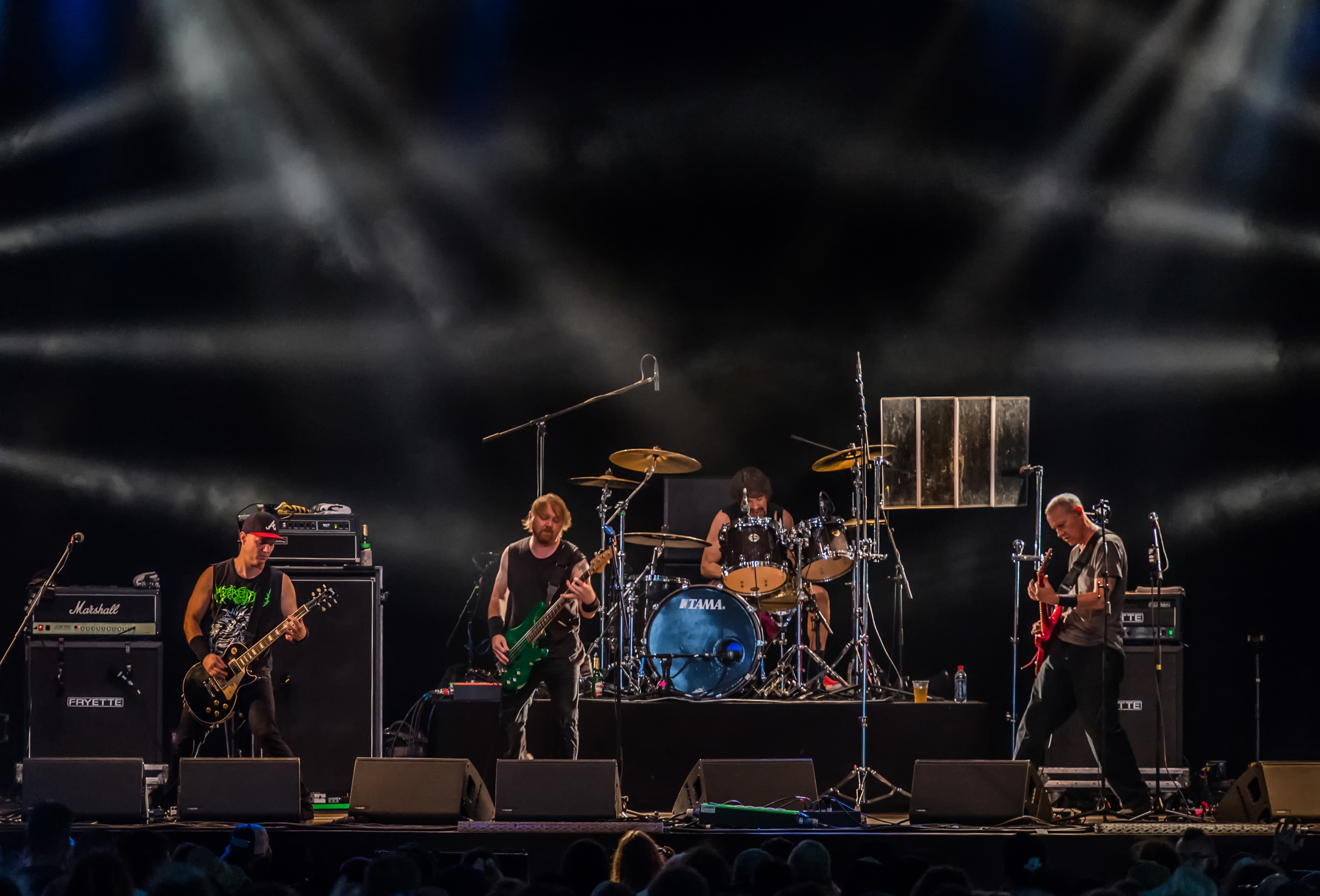
- Helmet at Wacken Open Air 2018

Background information
- Origin: New York City, U.S.
- Genres: Alternative metal; post-hardcore; noise rock
- Years active: 1989–1998; 2004–present
- Labels: Amphetamine Reptile; Interscope; Warcon; Work Song; earMUSIC
- Members: Page Hamilton; Kyle Stevenson; Dave Case; Dan Beeman
- Past members: Peter Mengede; John Stanier; Henry Bogdan; Rob Echeverria; Chris Traynor; John Tempesta; Frank Bello; Jeremy Chatelain; Charlie Walker; Anthony Truglio; Mike Jost; Jon Fullerm; Jimmy Thompson
- Website: helmetmusic.com

Helmet is an American alternative metal band from New York City formed in 1989 by vocalist and lead guitarist Page Hamilton. Helmet has had numerous lineup changes with Hamilton as the only constant member. Since 2010, the band has consisted of Hamilton, drummer Kyle Stevenson, guitarist Dan Beeman and bassist Dave Case.

Helmet has released nine studio albums and two compilation albums. After releasing their debut album, Strap It On (1990), on Amphetamine Reptile, Helmet signed to Interscope Records and released three albums for the label, including the highly successful Meantime (1992). Their next two albums ― Betty (1994) and Aftertaste (1997) ― were also successful, but did not match the critical or popular acclaim of Meantime. Helmet broke up in 1998, but reformed in 2004, and has since released five more albums ― Size Matters (2004), Monochrome (2006), Seeing Eye Dog (2010), Dead to the World (2016), and their latest, Left (2023).

== History ==
"Bad Mood" (1990)
30 second sample of the Strap It On track "Bad Mood".

=== Formation and early years (1989–1991) ===
Hamilton formed Helmet in early 1989 after leaving the alternative rock group Band of Susans, with whom he had recorded two albums. Having originally moved to New York to study jazz guitar at the Manhattan School of Music, the Oregon born guitarist recruited bassist Henry Bogdan who was also from Oregon, Australian guitarist Peter Mengede and Floridian drummer John Stanier as the group's first official line-up. Before Hamilton had settled on a name, the guitarist Peter Mengede's then-wife Reyne Cuccuro suggested the Germanic name "Helmuth". Hamilton misinterpreted her and mistakenly believed that she was referring to the form of protective gear. Hamilton then thought excitedly that Helmet had "sounded like a pretty cool name for a band" and opted for the Anglicized spelling. Other names taken in consideration were "Cry Ruth" and "Poly Orchids", along with the more esoteric and obscure "Tuna Lorenzo" and "Froth Albumen".

They were spotted by Tom Hazelmyer, guitarist of the band Halo of Flies, and signed to Hazelmyer's label Amphetamine Reptile Records, releasing their first 7 inch single, "Born Annoying", later that year(Released in album form with more tracks in 1995). Amphetamine Reptile released Helmet's debut studio album Strap It On in 1990, selling over 40,000 copies soon thereafter. Hazelmyer once stated that the album kept the label going through the 1990s.

=== Commercial successes (1992–1998) ===
Although Strap It On had achieved significant local success, major record labels were not interested in signing Helmet until after Nirvana achieved mainstream success in 1991, bringing the alternative music scene into the mainstream. Sometime thereafter, the band began receiving major label record deals from Relativity, Warner Bros. and Interscope Records. In January 1992, Helmet signed to Interscope, receiving a $1.2 million dollar advance split between three albums ($400,000 per record), $50,000 worth of tour support, and an unprecedented amount of control over their work. Their first album for Interscope, Meantime, was released in 1992 and certified gold in 1994. The album has sold over two million copies worldwide and remains Helmet's top-selling album. Helmet toured the United States, Brazil, Europe, and Asia relentlessly, generally with other AmRep recording artists. Internal tensions rose high at times.

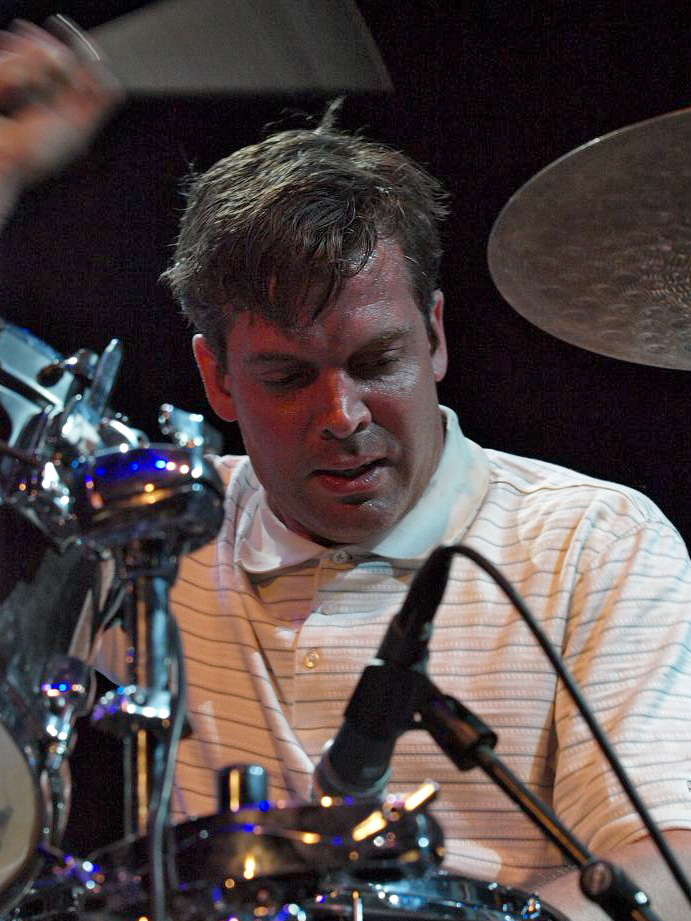
Former drummer John Stanier

In early 1993, Peter Mengede left Helmet due to a contractual dispute. He would later join the supergroup Handsome in 1995, which released one album on Epic Records in 1997 before disbanding. Mengede was replaced by Rob Echeverria, guitarist from the hardcore band Rest in Pieces. Helmet collaborated with House of Pain on the song "Just Another Victim" for the Judgment Night soundtrack. Helmet's third album, Betty, was released in 1994. Despite managing the band's highest-ever chart position on the Billboard 200 at number 45, the album did not sell as many copies as Meantime. In 1995, the band appeared in The Jerky Boys: The Movie, covering Black Sabbath's "Symptom of the Universe" with Ozzy Osbourne making a cameo appearance as the band's manager. Later, after recording and touring in support of Betty, Echeverria made an amicable departure from the band to join Biohazard.

"Overrated" (1994)
30 second sample of the Betty track "Overrated".

Helmet pushed on to record 1997's Aftertaste as a three-piece. A first version of the album had been withdrawn at the last minute in the fall of 1996 when promotional activities had already begun, delaying the disc's release to March of the following year with a new audio mix. Guitarist Chris Traynor (formerly of Orange 9mm) was recruited for the tour to support the album. While the song "Exactly What You Wanted" became a moderate radio hit, the album did not fare as well as Helmet's prior major label releases, spending a few weeks on the Billboard 200 chart and selling 132,000 copies over the next decade. The Aftertaste Tour in 1997 would prove to be the band's last for nearly a decade.

Amid long-standing private disputes, the members decided to call it quits, with Helmet's original final performance occurring in Italy on December 10, 1997. The band officially broke up in November 1998. Asked about the breakup, Hamilton replied, "9 years, 1,600 shows, 5 albums, and we found it hard to look at each other anymore". Bogdan formed the Moonlighters in New York with Bliss Blood, for whom he played steel guitar, before returning home to Oregon to play for the Midnight Serenaders. Stanier took a break from drumming, but returned to play drums for Tomahawk, The Mark of Cain, Battles and Primer 55.

=== Reunion (2003–present) ===
"Drug Lord" (2004)
30 second sample of the Size Matters track "Drug Lord".

Following Helmet's disbandment, Hamilton relocated from New York to Los Angeles and became involved in a variety of projects. This included playing guitar for David Bowie, doing sessions for film scores, working with composer Elliot Goldenthal on the 1999 soundtracks to In Dreams and Titus. It was Hamilton's second time working with Goldenthal, the first being the 1995 soundtrack to the movie Heat. When working on film scores, he was part of a "guitar orchestra" called "Deaf Elk" with other guitarists. He periodically returned to New York to work with his band Gandhi, which is where several of the songs appearing on Size Matters began.

In August 2003, Hamilton began working on a new musical project with Chris Traynor and drummer John Tempesta (formerly of Testament and White Zombie). Around this time, Interscope Records announced the release of the greatest hits compilation Unsung: The Best of Helmet (1991–1997) (2004), sparking speculation about a Helmet reunion and tour that was quickly denied by a spokesperson for Hamilton. In December 2003, Hamilton signed a new contract with Interscope; he was later urged by Interscope head Jimmy Iovine to record a new album for the label under the Helmet moniker. Having found it difficult to maintain Gandhi financially, Hamilton agreed to do so as "it meant I'd have money to make a record rather than it coming out of my pocket. So it was easier to put a band together." As his relationships with Stanier and Bogdan had not improved since 1998, and his previous offers to reunite had been rebuffed or ignored, Hamilton decided to move on and release more music as Helmet without them.

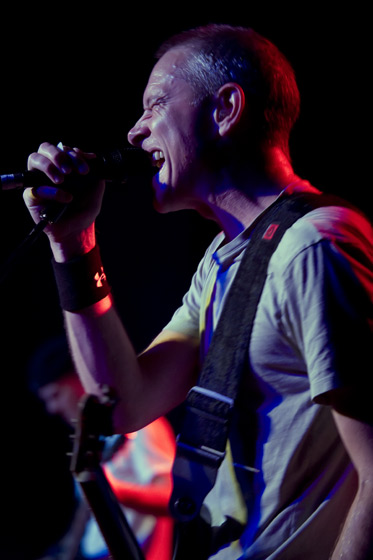
Page Hamilton c. 2008

With Tempesta on drums and Hamilton covering vocals and guitar, the three recorded Size Matters in early 2004. Traynor recorded both the album's guitar and bass parts. The album featured lyrics which were inspired by Hamilton's brief 2003 relationship with Hollywood actress Winona Ryder, and has been cited by critics as a departure from Helmet's earlier, more experimental sound. Frank Bello was later recruited to play bass on the supporting tour; however, he left before its conclusion to reunite with his original band, Anthrax. Jeremy Chatelain replaced Bello for the duration of the tour. John Tempesta left in early 2006 to join The Cult.

In November 2005, Helmet were dropped by Interscope following lackluster sales for Size Matters. Helmet then signed with Warcon Enterprises in March 2006 and announced that a new album was in the works. Helmet performed at the 2006 SXSW festival in Austin, Texas, with a temporary lineup consisting of Charlie Walker on drums, Chris Traynor on bass, and Anthony Truglio (formerly of Gandhi) on guitar. The new album, Monochrome, was recorded and co-produced by Wharton Tiers, who recorded Helmet's first two albums, Strap It On and Meantime. For the album, Hamilton and Traynor returned to the studio with newly recruited drummer, Mike Jost (formerly of Adair). Helmet headlined the 2006 Warped Tour in support of Monochrome, with Jeremy Chatelain reprising his role from the 2005 Size Matters tour. The band later split with Warcon due to a variety of financial disputes between Hamilton and the label's owners. Hamilton stated "Amphetamine Reptile and Interscope were both fantastic experiences for us, and Warcon was the first time that I'd actually run into any problems with a label. I trusted somebody and got screwed. I'm not bitter about it, but I lost a lot of money. They never paid me tour support that they were contractually obligated to pay. There were a lot of things. I've never seen one penny of royalties from them, but I own the record [Monochrome] now, so it's my record."

In September 2006, Chris Traynor announced that he had left the band after nearly a decade of working with Page Hamilton. A few days later, Mike Jost also left the band to attend to his duties as a new father. Jeremy Chatelain also made other commitments. Hamilton announced in early October 2006 that drum and bass duties would be filled by Kyle Stevenson and Jon Fuller, respectively, both from Milwaukee, and both previously members of Big Collapse. Australian Jimmy Thompson (formerly of Full Scale) also joined the band on guitar in 2006, but was replaced by Dan Beeman by late 2008. Due to line-up changes, Hamilton was forced to cancel many shows scheduled for late 2006 in the U.S. and Europe. Helmet opened up for Guns N' Roses for the remaining dates of their tour in December 2006. The band toured Australia in April and May 2008, playing shows throughout the eastern and southern coasts. Helmet's seventh studio album, Seeing Eye Dog, was released on September 7, 2010.

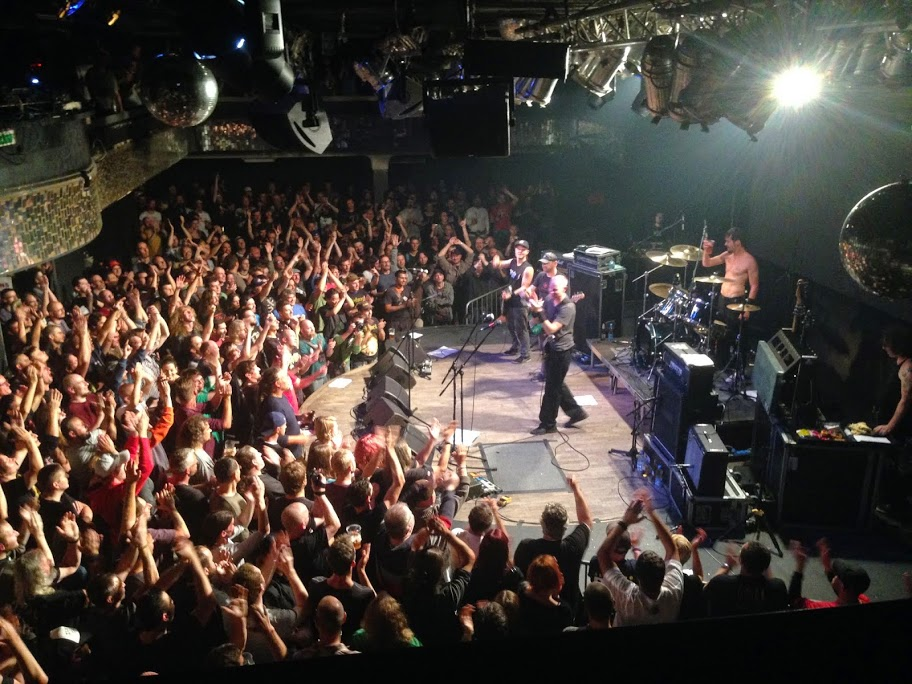
Betty 20th Anniversary European Tour. Opening concert - September 11, 2014, Lucerna music bar, Prague - Czech Republic

On November 20, 2011, Helmet announced the European Meantime Anniversary Tour running from March 5 to April 8, 2012, encompassing 28 shows in Portugal, Spain, Switzerland, Italy, Germany, Austria, Denmark, Netherlands, Belgium and the UK during which they played the whole of the Meantime in its entirety. Mengede briefly reunited with Hamilton and Helmet during one of the anniversary shows in Brisbane, Australia.

On October 28, 2016, Helmet released their eighth studio album, Dead to the World after the release of the single Bad News.

The band announced tour dates for May 2018 in the U.S. and July-August in Europe on their official website. Helmet also celebrated their 30th anniversary in 2019 with a European and North American tour. This tour continued in 2020 with dates in New Zealand and Australia.

In November 2019, St. Paul Pioneer Press reported that Helmet had been working on new material for their ninth studio album. On August 23, 2023, the band released "Holiday" as the lead single for their ninth album Left, which was released on November 10, 2023.

In July 2024 a U.S. tour with Local H was announced, as well as European dates celebrating the 30th anniversary of the album Betty. The U.S. tour with Local H was cancelled in August, but a new tour was scheduled for February-March 2025 with support from Norwegian band Slomosa, War on Women, and, for the final two shows, Effusion 35. A South American leg of the tour continued in April-May 2025 with support from the band Debrix.

== Musical style and image ==
"Ironhead" (1992)
30 second sample of the Meantime track "Ironhead". Helmet's riffing style proved highly influential to various nu metal groups.

Many critics cite Helmet as an alternative metal band; however, the band has been categorized under many genres, including post-hardcore, noise rock, experimental metal, post-metal and groove metal. Jim Farber of the New York Daily News jokingly labeled Helmet as "smart rock". Their music is characterized by repetitive, syncopated, staccato guitar riffs, often in unconventional time signatures, and almost always in a minor key with drop-D or drop-C tuning. The guitar sound is heavily distorted and dissonant, with choruses that often involve guitar feedback waves. Helmet has been described as a "thinking man's metal band"; according to Hamilton, the term came from original drummer John Stanier because he once heard an interviewer say it.

Helmet have generally resisted the association with heavy metal, however. Hamilton has stated, "People would say [to him], 'You’re not metal!' and I’d say, 'I know, I never said I was!' I dunno why people give a shit about what you’re meant to call yourselves."

Eschewing the traditional metal image of long hair and black clothing, the band stood out with their preference for simple T-shirts, jeans, and sneakers, and short haircuts. Their atypical look was referenced in an episode of Beavis and Butt-Head, in which the pair's commentary on the video for "Unsung" included the lines "That drummer looks like a regular guy" and "If you, like, saw these guys on the street, you wouldn't even know they were cool."

== Legacy and influences ==
The New York Times called Helmet "a band that made important connections between indie-rock and metal." Helmet have been cited as an influence by a number of key nu metal and industrial metal bands, including Limp Bizkit, Papa Roach, and Fear Factory. Musician Mike Patton has also cited Helmet as having a significant influence on his solo career; with original drummer John Stanier and Patton having played together in Tomahawk. Helmet is considered a major influence on nu-metal, with the band's use of drop tuning influencing many in the genre. Hamilton, displeased with this connection, said in 2011 "it's frustrating that people write [us] off because we're affiliated with or credited with or discredited with creating nu-metal and rap metal or whatever the fuck it is, which we sound nothing like." Despite this, Hamilton would later collaborate with nu metal bands Linkin Park and P.O.D.

Helmet has also been cited as an influence by post-hardcore acts Quicksand, Snapcase, and Orange 9mm. Regarding Helmet's influence on rock, Hamilton remarked "I hear it all over the place. I've heard Helmet riffs in Evanescence. Kids today have no idea at this point, because they [first] got into, say, Korn or System of a Down. Bands like Mastodon and Norma Jean tell me, 'Oh, we ripped you guys off with this,' or 'We got turned on by that.' Some bands do cool things with it, and there's a bunch of shitty bands that have imitated us too."

In 2016, a tribute album titled Meantime Redux was released. It featured covers of 1990s Helmet songs (including all 10 songs from the Meantime album) by various underground hardcore bands. Deftones bassist Chi Cheng remarked "Every band should wish to aspire to the originality and genius of Helmet. An inspiration to fans and musicians-alike". Norma Jean guitarist Chris Day recalled in 2006 "The first song I ever learned to play on the guitar was a Helmet song. I pretty much just tried to figure the songs out and that's how I learned to play basically. Helmet is a band that I have listened to for years and will always enjoy them because they have the sweetest riffs I have ever heard. I love to air drum to them in the car also. I wouldn't be the same without Helmet in my life."

== Band members ==
Current

- Page Hamilton – lead guitar, lead vocals (1989–1998, 2004–present)
- Kyle Stevenson – drums, backing vocals (2006–present)
- Dan Beeman – rhythm guitar, backing vocals (2008–present)
- Dave Case – bass, backing vocals (2010–present)

Former

- Peter Mengede – rhythm guitar (1989–1993)
- John Stanier – drums (1989–1998)
- Henry Bogdan – bass (1989–1998)
- Rob Echeverria – rhythm guitar (1993–1996)
- Chris Traynor – rhythm guitar, bass, backing vocals (1997–1998, 2004–2006)
- John Tempesta – drums (2004–2006)
- Frank Bello – bass (touring 2004–2005)
- Jeremy Chatelain – bass (touring 2005–2006)
- Charlie Walker – drums (touring 2006)
- Anthony Truglio – rhythm guitar (touring 2006)
- Mike Jost – drums (2006)
- Jon Fuller – bass (touring 2006–2010)
- Jimmy Thompson – rhythm guitar (2006–2007)

== Discography ==
- Strap It On (1990)
- Meantime (1992)
- Betty (1994)
- Aftertaste (1997)
- Size Matters (2004)
- Monochrome (2006)
- Seeing Eye Dog (2010)
- Dead to the World (2016)
- Left (2023)

== See also ==
- List of alternative metal artists
