= John Stanier (drummer) =

American drummer

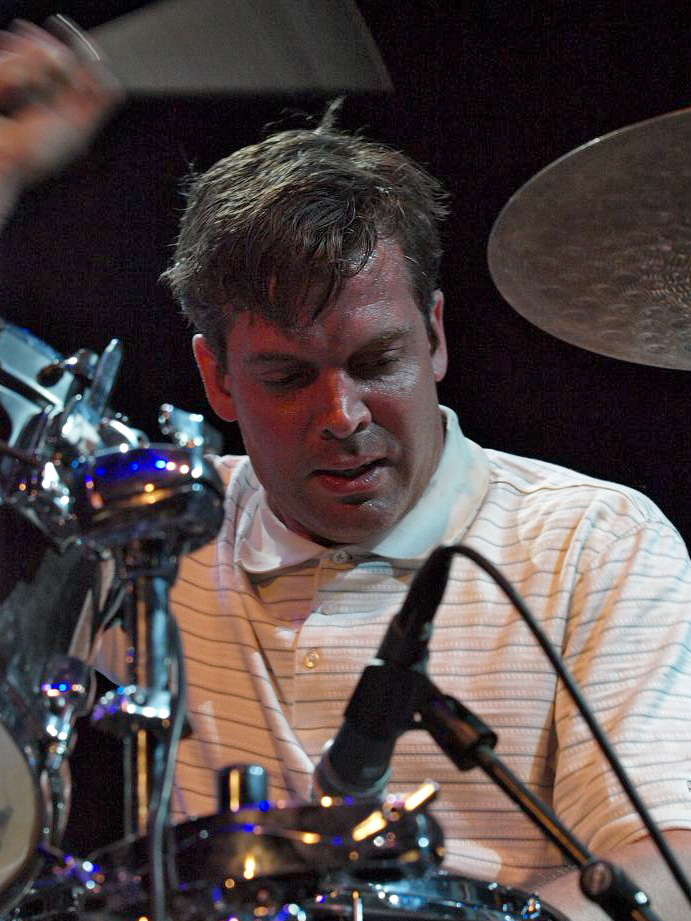
- Stanier at Moers Festival 2008

Background information
- Born: August 2, 1968 (age 58); Baltimore, Maryland, U.S.
- Genres: Alternative rock; alternative metal; experimental rock
- Occupation: Drummer
- Years active: 1989–1998, 2000–present
- Labels: Ipecac; Warp; BMG
- Member of: Tomahawk; Battles
- Formerly of: Helmet; The Mark of Cain

John Stanier (born August 2, 1968) is an American drummer. He was first known as a founding member of the alternative metal band Helmet, which he played in from 1989 to 1998. He has played in the experimental rock band Battles since 2002.

Stanier also plays in the supergroup Tomahawk and previously performed with the Australian rock band the Mark of Cain.

== Early life and education ==
John Stanier was born on August 2, 1968. He grew up in Pittsburgh, Pennsylvania, and various cities in Florida.

== Career ==
In 1989, Stanier joined Helmet as their drummer. He played on the band's first four studio albums: Strap It On (1990),Meantime (1992), Betty (1994), and Aftertaste (1997). The breakup of Helmet in 1998 was supposedly amicable, though Stanier has offered few details since the initial end of the band. In a 2020 interview with Modern Drummer, Stanier said there was "no big story or anything" regarding his time in Helmet. "It was just... time to call it a day. We'd been around for 10 years... no drama or fights or anything like that." Stanier has not kept in contact with former band mates Page Hamilton and Henry Bogdan, and Hamilton has commented that Stanier has ignored attempts to communicate.

Stanier was recruited by the Australian band the Mark of Cain, and played on their 2001 album This is This.

Also in 2000, Stanier was recruited to play live drums on songs for the industrial metal band Pitchshifter's fifth album, Deviant, and was also invited to join Tomahawk by the project's co-founder Duane Denison. In 2002, Stanier was recruited by guitarist Ian Williams to join Battles.

== Recognition ==
Stanier is known for his speed, endurance, and precision as a performer. Modern Drummer has described Stanier as a "powerhouse", while Rolling Stone ranked him at number 84 in their list of the 100 Greatest Drummers Of All Time in 2016.

== Discography ==
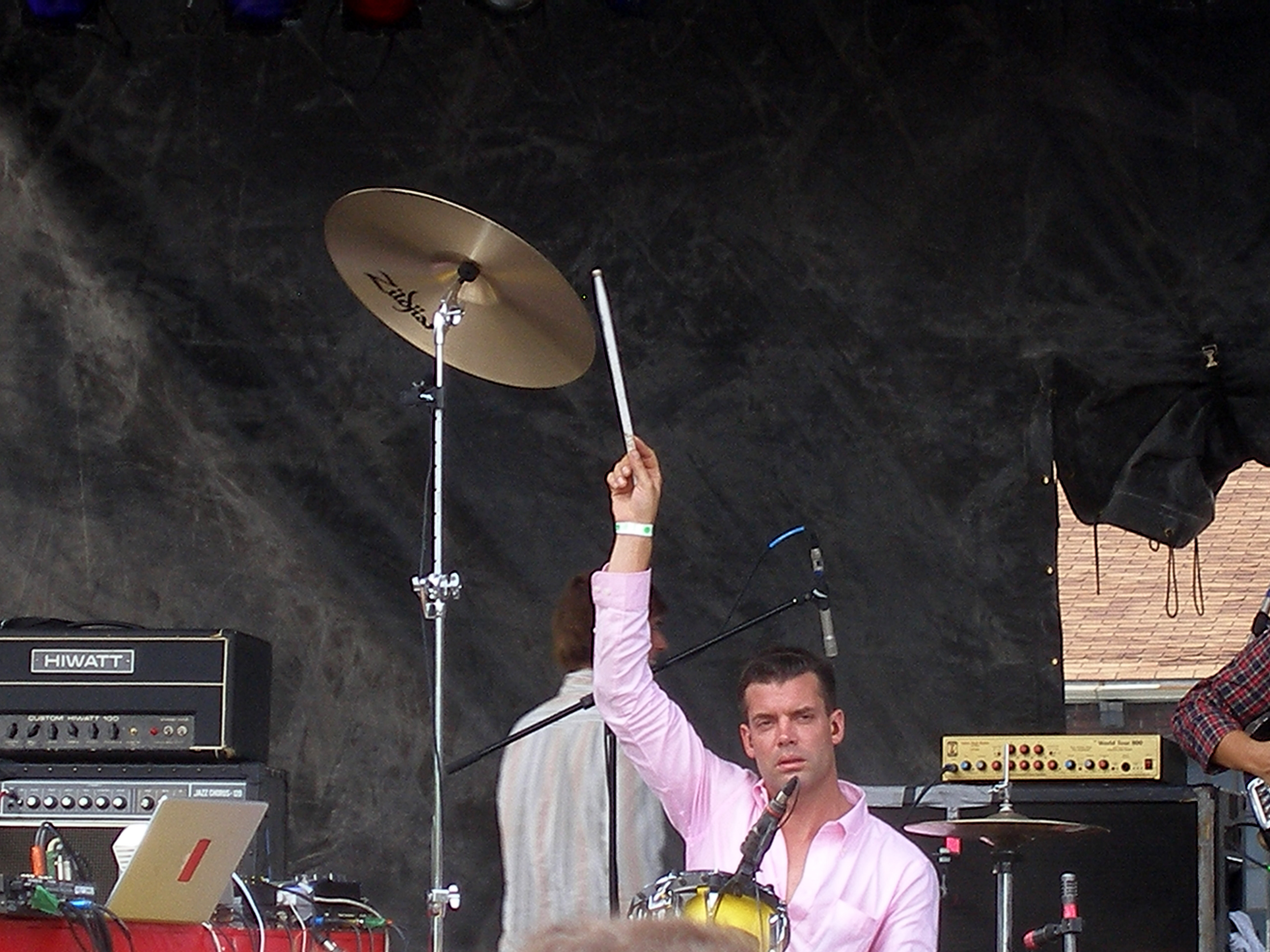
Stanier playing with Battles in 2007

=== As a band member ===
with Helmet

- Strap It On (1990)
- Meantime (1992)
- Betty (1994)
- Aftertaste (1997)

with The Mark of Cain

- This Is This (2001)
- Songs of the Third and Fifth (2012)

with Tomahawk

- Tomahawk (2001)
- Mit Gas (2003)
- Anonymous (2007)
- Oddfellows (2013)
- Tonic Immobility (2021)

with Battles

- Mirrored (2007)
- Gloss Drop (2011)
- La Di Da Di (2015)
- Juice B Crypts (2019)

=== As a studio contributor ===
- Pitchshifter – Deviant (2000)
- Primer 55 – (the) New Release (2001)
- Align – Some Breaking News (2001)
- Cage – Weatherproof (2003)
- Melissa Auf der Maur – Auf der Maur (2004)
- Primer 55 – Family for Life (2007)
- Prefuse 73 – Preparations (2007)
- The Field – Yesterday and Today (2009)
- Rone – Tohu Bonus (2013), in the track "Pool"
- Rone – Mirapolis (2017), in both "Brest" and "Lou" tracks
