= Page Hamilton =

American singer and guitarist

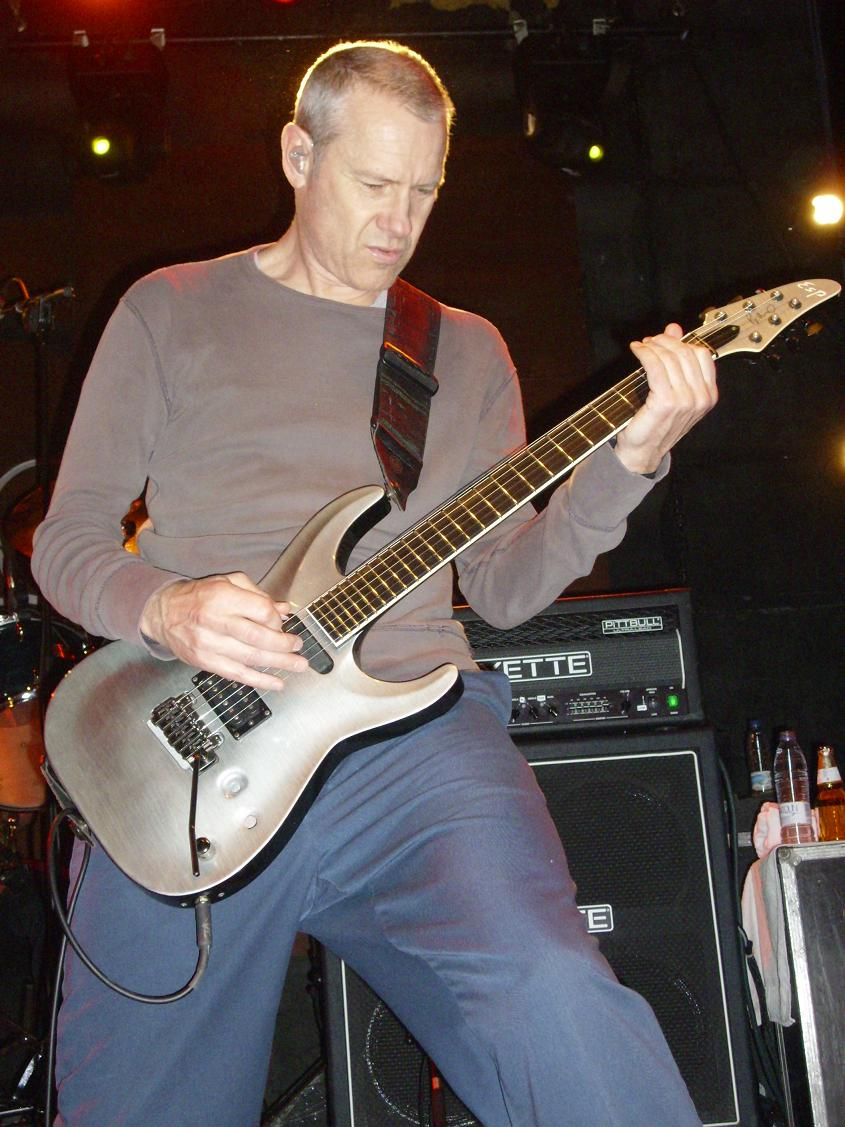
- Hamilton performing with Helmet in 2012

Background information
- Born: May 18, 1960 (age 66); Portland, Oregon, U.S.
- Genres: Alternative metal; hard rock; post-hardcore; noise rock
- Occupations: Musician; songwriter; producer
- Instruments: Vocals; guitar
- Years active: 1979–present
- Member of: Helmet; Page Hamilton Quintet
- Formerly of: Band of Susans; Gandhi; David Bowie band
- Website: pagehamiltonmusic.com

Page Nye Hamilton (born May 18, 1960) is an American guitarist, singer, songwriter and record producer who founded the American heavy metal band Helmet in 1989. In the 1990s, Helmet and Hamilton were forerunners of alternative metal with the albums Meantime (1992) and Betty (1994) and are considered one of the most influential metal albums of all time. Although he is mainly known for his work in heavy metal and post-hardcore music, Hamilton also earned an undergraduate degree from the University of Oregon and later earned a Master's degree in jazz guitar from the Manhattan School of Music. Hamilton also has connections to avant-garde music and film soundtrack composition.

== Life and career ==
=== Background ===
Hamilton was born on May 18, 1960, in Portland, Oregon, and raised in Medford, Oregon. He studied guitar at the University of Oregon before moving to New York to study jazz guitar at the Manhattan School of Music. While there he played in avant-garde composer Glenn Branca's guitar orchestra, performing the composer's Symphony No.6 (Devil Choirs at the Gates of Heaven), and joined noise rock band Band of Susans, performing on their Love Agenda album and Peel Sessions, before finally forming his own group, Helmet.

=== Helmet ===
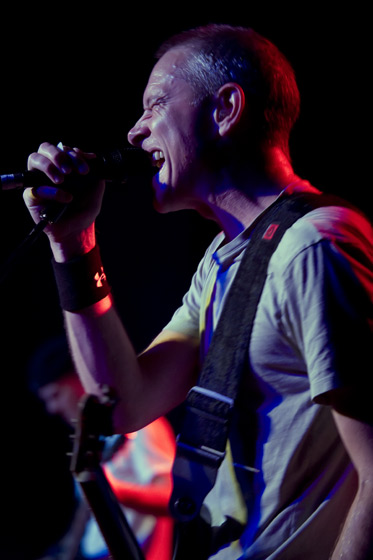
Hamilton with Helmet at The Hifi Bar, Melbourne, May 2008

Helmet initially signed to Amphetamine Reptile Records, releasing a number of 7" singles and one album, 1990's Strap It On. The band then signed to Interscope Records, releasing Meantime (1992), Betty (1994) and Aftertaste (1997). After a seven-year hiatus, the band returned with Size Matters (2004). A year after the release of Size Matters, they left Interscope, and the band released the albums Monochrome (2006), Seeing Eye Dog (2010), Dead to the World (2016) and Left (2023).

Meantime was the band's principal commercial success, being certified gold by the Recording Industry Association of America. The album was well received by music critics and is seen as an influential metal record and earning a Grammy nomination in the Best Metal Performance category for 1993.

Since 2004, Hamilton has been the only founding member left in Helmet, and after the departure of guitarist Chris Traynor in 2006, he has been the only member to have been involved with Helmet during its original run in the 1990s. Hamilton has said that he hopes to keep playing with Helmet until he is "physically incapable".

=== Gandhi ===
Following Helmet's temporary dissolution in the late 1990s, Hamilton formed another rock band, Gandhi, with former Liege Lord guitarist Anthony Truglio, John Andrews (guitar), Christian Bongers (bass), and Matt Flynn (later the drummer for Maroon 5). Though the band did not release any music officially, several demo songs were leaked. Many of these were later recorded for the Size Matters and Monochrome releases by Helmet.

=== Movie soundtracks ===
While still active with Helmet, Hamilton embarked on a career composing and performing music for film, working on movies including Heat, Titus, In Dreams, Catwoman, and Chicago Cab. Helmet also contributed to a number of movie soundtracks, including The Crow, Feeling Minnesota, Johnny Mnemonic, Judgment Night, Saw III, Underworld, and appearing in The Jerky Boys: The Movie (performing a cover of the Black Sabbath song "Symptom of the Universe").

=== Production ===
Hamilton has also worked as a record producer, most notably producing the album Distort Yourself by former Bush singer Gavin Rossdale's band Institute. He has also produced albums for the bands Bullets and Octane (In the Mouth of the Young), Classic Case (Losing at Life), and Totimoshi.

=== David Bowie, collaborations, other work ===
During Helmet's hiatus, Hamilton was lead guitarist for David Bowie's band on the singer's Hours Tour.

He has collaborated with German avant-garde guitarist Caspar Brötzmann on the live improvisational album Zulutime and performed on a number of other artists' works, including trumpeter Ben Neill's Goldbug, alt-country songwriter Joe Henry's Trampoline, Northern Irish rock band Therapy?'s Troublegum and British post-punk group Wire's Object 47.

As a jazz musician, he has performed with his own groups, the Page Hamilton Quintet and the Jazz Wannabes, and with fellow guitarist and mentor John Stowell.

He has also produced a guitar instruction DVD, Sonic Shapes: Expanding Rock Guitar Vocabulary, published by Hal Leonard Corporation.

During the spring of 2008, Page provided guest vocals on post-hardcore band Norma Jean's fourth studio album The Anti Mother as well as contributed to the writing of track 8, "Opposite of Left and Wrong".

In 2014, Hamilton appeared on Linkin Park's sixth studio album The Hunting Party, which he provided additional vocals (on the chorus) and guitars on the album's second track "All for Nothing". The song was self-produced by Mike Shinoda and Brad Delson.

== Personal life ==
Hamilton was married during the 1990s, but later divorced. At the beginning of 2002, he moved to Los Angeles, citing the rising cost of living in New York as a reason for the move. The following year he entered a year long relationship with American actress Winona Ryder. According to Hamilton, she was a listener of the band, and many of the lyrics on Helmet's 2004 comeback Size Matters were reportedly inspired by their relationship.

== Equipment ==
Hamilton endorsed ESP Guitars in the 1990s, and is best known for playing ESP Horizon guitars with either a Floyd Rose or Wilkinson tremolo, and DiMarzio Airzone pickups. In 2006 ESP announced a Page Hamilton signature model, featuring a single DiMarzio Airzone pickup and Wilkinson tremolo. In 2009, ESP announced a further signature model guitar, this time modeled after Page's own ESP Horizon Custom, featuring a distressed magenta finish emulating the original guitar's road wear and character and, again, a single DiMarzio Air Zone pickup. His ESP Horizon is on the cover of every Helmet album since Meantime.

For live performances, Page Hamilton uses a Fryette Pittbull Ultra-Lead into a Fryette Fatbottom 4x12 cabinet. In the 1990s, Hamilton used a Harry Kolbe preamp into a Marshall 2204S (small-box head) with its gain all the way up, then into a dummy load, then into a noise gate, then finally into a Mesa Boogie Simul-class 290 power amplifier that fed four Harry Kolbe 4x12 cabinets.
