= Alternative metal =

Music genre

- Stylistic origins: Heavy metal; alternative rock
- Cultural origins: Mid-1980s, United States
- Derivative forms: Soft grunge (grungegaze)

Subgenres
- Funk metal; nu metal; rap metal

Fusion genres
- Neue Deutsche Härte

Regional scenes
- California

Local scenes
- Los Angeles, California

Alternative metal (also known as alt-metal) is a genre of heavy metal music that combines heavy metal with influences from alternative rock and other genres not normally associated with metal. Alternative metal bands are often characterized by heavily downtuned, mid-paced guitar riffs, a mixture of accessible melodic vocals and harsh vocals and sometimes sounds that are unconventional within other heavy metal styles. The term has been in use since the 1980s, although it came into prominence in the 1990s.

Other genres considered part of the alternative metal movement included rap metal and funk metal, both of which influenced another prominent subgenre, nu metal. Nu metal expands the alternative metal sound, combining its vocal stylings and downtuned riffs with elements of other genres, such as hip-hop, funk, thrash metal, hardcore punk and industrial metal.

Alternative metal began in the 1980s with bands like Faith No More, Living Colour, Soundgarden, and Jane's Addiction. The genre achieved success in the 1990s with the popularity of bands like Helmet, Tool, and Alice in Chains. In the late 1990s and early 2000s, nu metal achieved mainstream popularity with the mainstream success of bands like Korn, Limp Bizkit, P.O.D., Papa Roach, Disturbed, System of a Down, Linkin Park, Slipknot, Deftones and Staind. After the mid-2000s, nu metal's popularity began to decline, with many nu metal bands moving on to other genres.

== Characteristics ==
One of the main characteristics of alternative metal and its subgenres are heavily downtuned, mid-paced "chug"-like guitar riffs. However, funk metal bands often use a more conventional riffing style influenced by 1980s thrash metal. Alternative metal features clean and melodic vocals, influenced by those of alternative rock, in contrast to other heavy metal subgenres. Later bands frequently incorporated vocal styles that alternated between clean singing, growls and screaming. Examples include alternative metal bands associated with the nu metal movement, such as Korn and Deftones, who have been described as having "bipolar vocals".

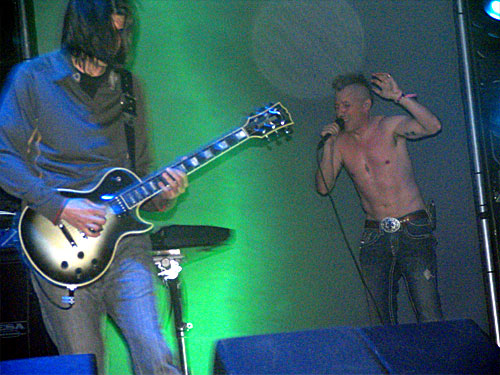
Tool (pictured) is one of the most influential alternative metal bands

Jonathan Gold of the Los Angeles Times wrote in 1990 "Just as rock has an alternative, [left] wing-bands like the Replacements and Dinosaur Jr.-so does metal. Alternative metal is alternative music that rocks. And alternative metal these days can reach 10 times the audience of other alternative rock. Jane's Addiction plays an intense brand of '70s-influenced arty metal; so does Soundgarden. In fact, the arty meanderings of Sabbath and Zeppelin themselves would be considered alternative metal." Houston Press has described the genre as being a "compromise for people for whom Nirvana was not heavy enough but Metallica was too heavy."

The first wave of alternative metal bands emerged from many backgrounds, including hardcore punk (Bad Brains, Rollins Band, Life of Agony, Corrosion of Conformity), noise rock (Helmet, the Jesus Lizard, Today Is the Day), Seattle's grunge scene (Alice in Chains, Soundgarden), stoner rock (Clutch, Kyuss), sludge metal (Fudge Tunnel, Melvins), gothic metal (Type O Negative), groove metal (Pantera, White Zombie) and industrial (Godflesh, Nine Inch Nails, Ministry). These bands never formed a distinct movement or scene; rather they were bound by their incorporation of traditional metal influences and openness to experimentation. Jane's Addiction borrowed from art rock and progressive rock, Quicksand blended post-hardcore and Living Colour injected funk into their sound, for example, while Primus were influenced by progressive rock, thrash metal and funk and Faith No More mixed progressive rock, R&B, funk and hip-hop. Fudge Tunnel's style of alternative metal included influences from both sludge metal and noise rock.

== History ==
=== Origins (1980s) ===
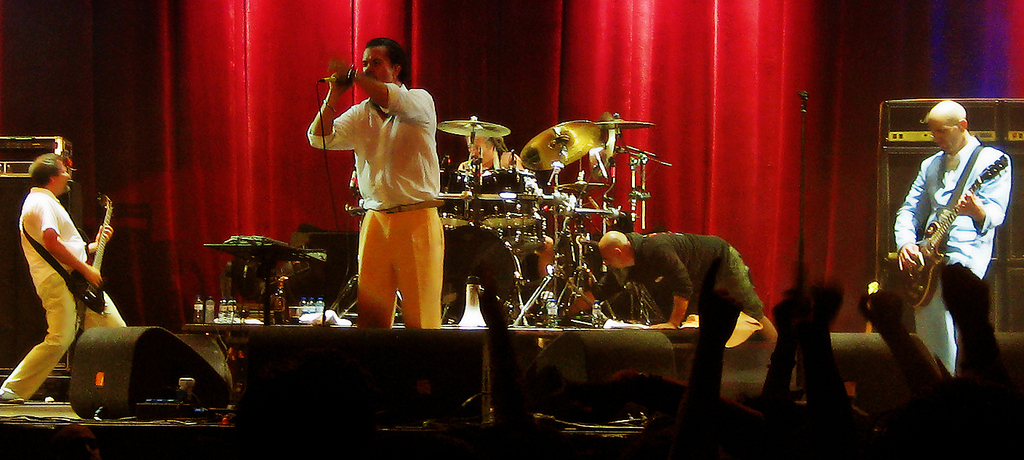
Faith No More performing in 2009

The origins of the genre can be traced back to funk rock music of the early to mid-1980s, when alternative bands like Fishbone, Faith No More and the Red Hot Chili Peppers started mixing heavy metal with funk, creating a genre called funk metal, now often recognized as an early form of alternative metal. Other early bands in the genre also came from hardcore punk backgrounds. Bands such as Faith No More, Jane's Addiction and Soundgarden are recognized as some of the earliest alternative metal acts, with all three of these bands emerging around the same time, and setting the template for the genre by mixing heavy metal music with a variety of different genres in the mid to late 1980s. During the 1980s, alternative metal appealed mainly to alternative rock fans, since virtually all 1980s alt-metal bands had their roots in the American independent rock scene. Living Colour was another alternative metal band that combined the genre with funk metal.

=== Expansion and breakthrough (1990–1997) ===
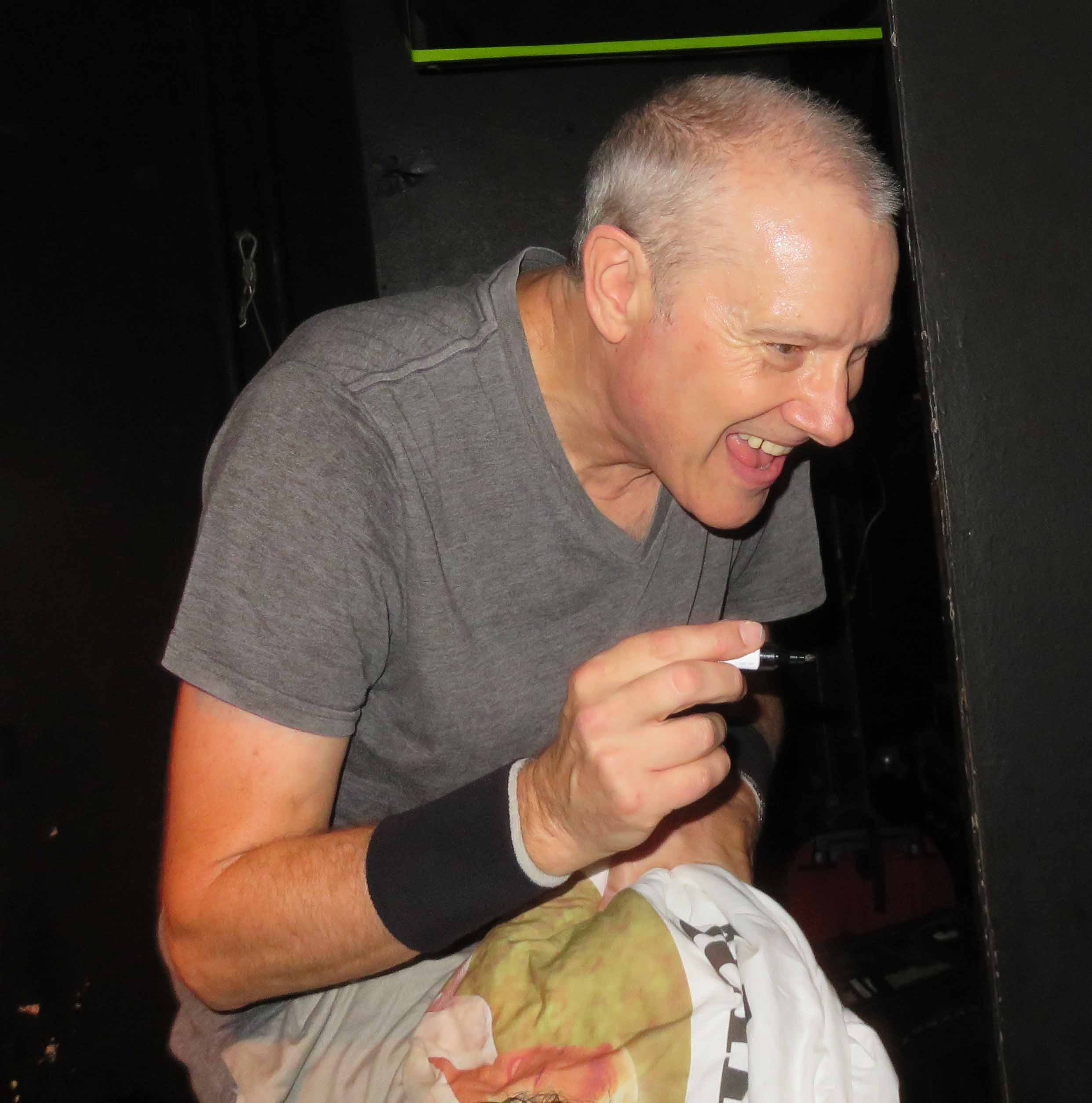
Page Hamilton, founder of Helmet, signing autographs in Frankfurt, Germany in 2019

The emergence of grunge as a popular style of rock music in the early 1990s helped make alternative metal more acceptable to a mainstream audience, with alternative metal soon becoming the most popular metal style of the 1990s. Several bands associated with the genre denied their status as metal bands. Helmet drummer John Stanier said "We fell into the whole metal thing by accident, we always hated it when people mentioned metal in conjunction with us." Helmet's Meantime (1992) album became one of the most influential heavy metal albums of the 1990s. Saby Reyes-Kulkarni of Pitchfork stated "bands like Faith No More, Soundgarden, Primus, Helmet, the Rollins Band, and dozens more were initially marketed as quasi-metal acts. This was only possible in a climate where record labels, journalists, and college radio DJs understood that the metal audience could embrace new, albeit arty variations on the form."

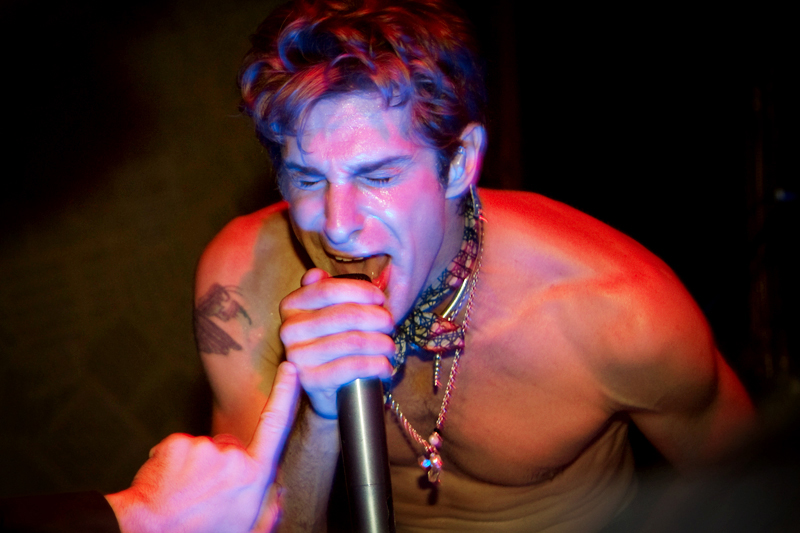
The founding of the Lollapalooza festival by Jane's Addiction frontman Perry Farrell helped alternative bands like Tool and Nine Inch Nails gain exposure

The alternative music festival Lollapalooza conceived by Jane's Addiction singer Perry Farrell, helped bands associated with the movement such as Tool, Rage Against the Machine, Primus, Nine Inch Nails, Soundgarden, and Alice in Chains gain exposure. The progressive rock-influenced band Tool became a leading band in the alternative metal genre with the release of their 1993 debut album Undertow; Tool's popularity in the mid-'90s helped kick off an era of bands with alt-metal tendencies also classified in other genres like industrial (Nine Inch Nails) and rap rock (Rage Against the Machine). Spin stated in August 1998 that "It was Helmet that spawned the idea of alternative metal with the punk crutch of 1992's Meantime [and] bands such as Rage Against the Machine took the concept a crucial step further, integrating hip-hop to connect with skate rat kids raised on Metallica and Run D.M.C." Many established 1980s metal bands released albums in the 1990s that were described as alternative metal, including Anthrax, Metallica and Mötley Crüe. Bands like Life of Agony combined alternative metal with hardcore punk influences. Life of Agony's debut album River Runs Red combined alternative metal with influences of hardcore punk, with lyrics about depression and suicide.

In the latter part of the 1990s, a second, more aggressive wave of alternative metal emerged; dubbed nu metal, it often relied on hardcore punk, groove/thrash metal, industrial and hip-hop influences, as opposed to the influences of the first wave of alternative metal bands, with this style subsequently becoming more popular than regular alternative metal. It resulted in a more standardized sound among alternative metal bands, in contrast to the more eccentric and unclassifiable early alternative metal bands. Korn, a band formed in 1993, released their self-titled debut the following year, which is widely considered to be the first nu metal release. MTV stated that Korn "arrived in 1993 into the burgeoning alternative metal scene, which would morph into nü-metal the way college rock became alternative rock." Stereogum similarly claimed that nu metal was a "weird outgrowth of the Lollapalooza-era alt-metal scene".

=== Nu metal's commercial peak (1997–2004) ===
During the late 1990s and early 2000s, nu metal became prevalent in the mainstream, with bands such as Korn, Limp Bizkit, P.O.D., Papa Roach, Disturbed, System of a Down, Linkin Park, Slipknot, Deftones and Staind all attaining success. AllMusic has compared nu and alternative metal's commercial success during this period to the rise of the glam metal phenomenon in the 1980s, stating that it is "ironic, given alternative metal's vehement rejection of hair metal's attitude." Some nu metal bands managed to push musical boundaries while still remaining commercially viable, such as Mudvayne (who combined progressive elements) and Deftones, who have incorporated post-hardcore and dream pop influences.

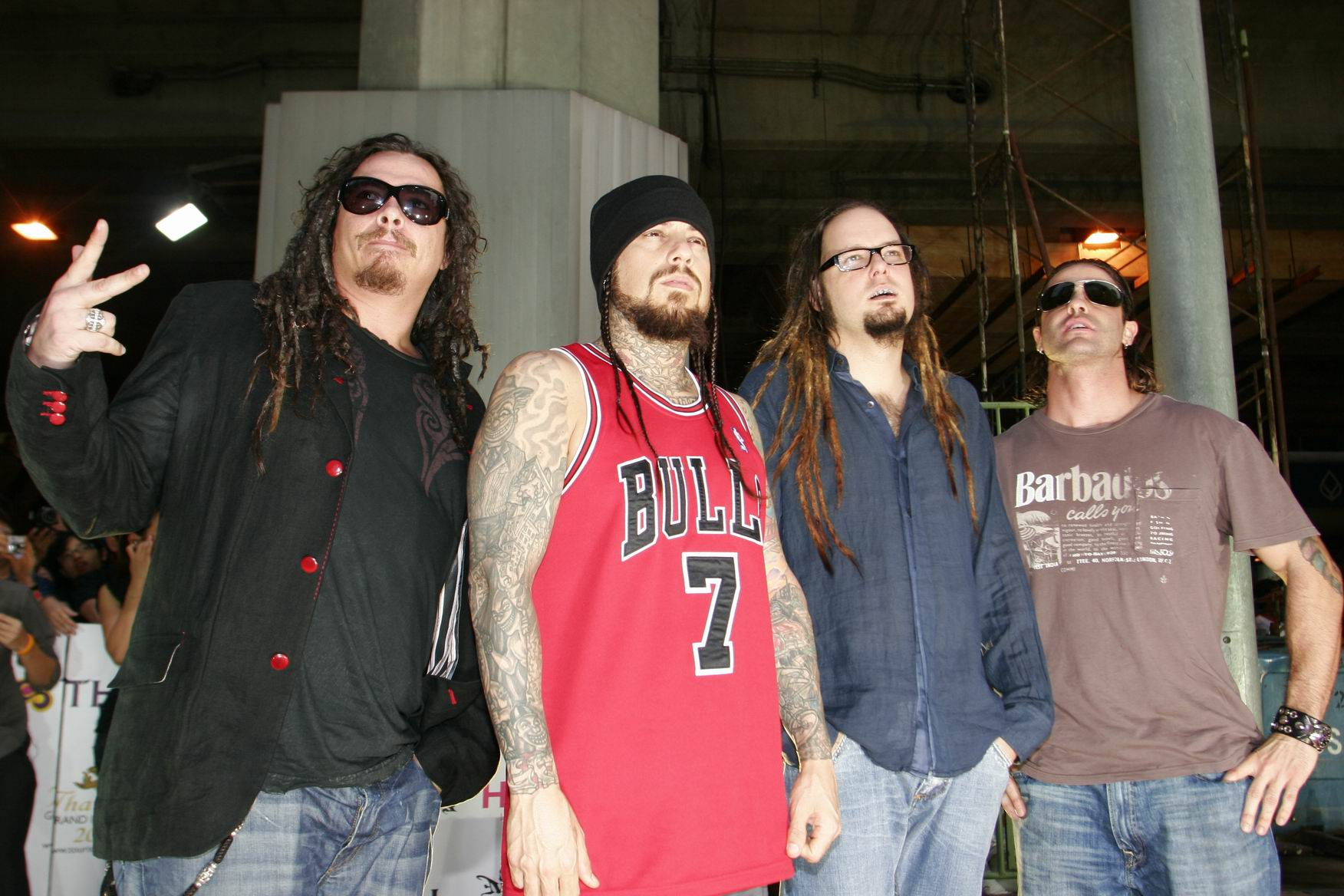
Korn in 2006

Korn's 1998 album Follow the Leader and 1999 album Issues sold 3.6 million and 3.2 million copies in the United States, respectively, and the band's 2002 album Untouchables sold 1.4 million. Korn's eponymous debut (1994) and second album Life is Peachy (1996) sold 2.1 million and 1.8 million copies, respectively. Limp Bizkit's Significant Other (1999) and Chocolate Starfish and the Hot Dog Flavored Water (2000) sold over seven million and six million, respectively. Korn and Limp Bizkit were frequently featured on MTV, often hitting number 1 and having multiple retired videos on the popular MTV show Total Request Live, competing on the show with boy bands like N'Sync and Backstreet Boys. Papa Roach's album Infest (2000) went triple platinum and was supported by the hit single "Last Resort". Bands like P.O.D. and Linkin Park also had widespread popularity.

Joel McIver believes that the band Tool is important to the development of this genre; he wrote in his book Unleashed: The Story of Tool, "By 1996 and '97 the wave of alternative metal spearheaded by Tool in the wake of grunge was beginning to evolve into nu-metal". However, Tool's vocalist Maynard James Keenan was quick to separate himself from this movement saying "I'm sick of that whole attitude. The one that puts Tool in with [nu] metal bands. The press... can't seem to distinguish between alternative and metal." Other alternative metal bands considered influential to the nu metal genre such as Helmet have also tried to distance themselves from the movement.

=== Decline in nu metal and continuity in popularity of alternative metal (2004–2009) ===
In 2004, nu metal's popularity was declining, with bands like Korn, Limp Bizkit and P.O.D. having a decline in album sales. Instead, post-grunge bands like Nickelback were selling the most records and being promoted the most on radio. Additionally, many nu metal bands began to move away from the nu metal genre and moved on to other genres.

=== Mainstream decline (2010s) ===
In 2016, Jason Heller of Vice wrote "The term alternative metal still pops up from time to time, but it's no more relevant or meaningful today than alternative rock. Instead, it's a relic. But the brief, nebulous era of alternative metal in the late 80s and early 90s remains a snapshot of a vibrant time when a brash new generation of heavy-leaning bands threw everything against the wall to see what stuck."

== See also ==
- List of alternative metal bands

== Citations ==
=== Bibliography ===
- Christe, Ian (2003). Sound of the Beast: The Complete Headbanging History of Heavy Metal. HarperCollins. ISBN 0-380-81127-8.
