= Gang Banged With a Headache, and Live =

Live album by Don Caballero
- Released: November 27, 2012
- Recorded: March 6, 2004
- Venue: Empty Bottle (Chicago, Illinois)
- Genre: Math rock
- Length: 42:46
- Label: Joyful Noise
- Producer: Don Caballero

Don Caballero chronology
Punkgasm (2008)	Gang Banged With a Headache, and Live (2012)

Gang Banged With a Headache, and Live is a live album by American math rock band Don Caballero. Released in 2012, it features songs from the band's discography performed by a line-up consisting of members Damon Che, Jeff Ellsworth, Gene Doyle, and Jason Jouver.

== Track listing ==
All tracks are written by Don Caballero.

No.	Title	Original release	Length
1.	"Fire Back About Your New Baby's Sex"	American Don (2000)	4:27
2.	"And and and, He Lowered the Twin Down"	World Class Listening Problem (2006)	4:12
3.	"In the Absence of Strong Evidence to the Contrary, One May Step Out of the Way of the Charging Bull"	What Burns Never Returns (1998)	3:51
4.	"Delivering the Groceries at 138 Beats Per Minute"	What Burns Never Returns	4:29
5.	"Don Caballero 3"	What Burns Never Returns	3:36
6.	"Let's Face It Pal, You Haven't Lived Afro Pop" (medley of "Let's Face It Pal, You Didn't Need That Eye Surgery" and "Haven't Lived Afro Pop")	American Don	6:38
7.	"Belted Sweater"	For Respect (1993)	2:11
8.	"Palm Trees in the Fecking Bahamas"	World Class Listening Problem	4:06
9.	"I Never Liked You"	American Don	5:26
10.	"From the Desk of Elsewhere Go"	What Burns Never Returns	3:50
Total length:			42:46

== Personnel ==
=== Don Caballero ===
- Damon Che – drums
- Jason Jouver – bass guitar
- Gene Doyle – guitar
- Jeff Ellsworth – guitar

=== Technical ===
- Corey Barnes – mixing
- Carl Saff – mastering
- David Woodruff – layout
- Damon Che – photography
