= Atlas (Battles song) =

Single by Battles

from the album Mirrored
- B-side: "Atlas" (DJ Koze Remix)
- Released: April 2, 2007
- Genre: Indie rock; progressive rock
- Length: 7:09
- Label: Warp
- Songwriters: Ian Williams, John Stanier, Dave Konopka, Tyondai Braxton

Battles singles chronology
"Tras" (2004)	"Atlas" (2007)	"Tonto" (2007)

"Atlas" is a song by the American experimental rock band Battles. The song is the second track of Battles' debut album Mirrored, and was released as the lead single on April 2, 2007. "Atlas" received critical acclaim and was included on many critics' year-end and decade-end best songs lists. It was included in the video games LittleBigPlanet and Major League Baseball 2K8. The song was also used by Dodge for their advertisement of the 2013 Dodge Dart (PF), by Quicken Loans during their Super Bowl 50 commercial for their advertisement of their "Rocket Mortgage" program, and in 2021 by Ford in their Ford F-150 Lightning electric pickup announcement advertisement.

== Accolades ==
Publication	Country	Accolade	Year	Rank
Pitchfork	United States	Top 100 Tracks of 2007	2007	2
Festive Fifty	United Kingdom	50 best songs of the year	2007	1
Pitchfork	United States	The Top 500 Tracks of the 2000s	2009	42
NME	United Kingdom	150 Best Tracks of the Past 15 Years	2011	54

== Track listing ==
No.	Title	Length
1.	"Atlas"	7:09
2.	"Atlas" (DJ Koze Remix)	7:04
Total length:		14:13
