= Ice Cream (Battles song) =

Single by Battles featuring Matias Aguayo

from the album Gloss Drop
- Released: May 23, 2011
- Recorded: 2011
- Genre: Post-rock; math rock; art rock; funk rock; neo-psychedelia
- Length: 4:36
- Label: Warp
- Songwriters: Ian Williams, John Stanier, Dave Konopka, Matias Aguayo
- Producers: Keith Souza; Battles

Battles featuring Matias Aguayo singles chronology
"The Line" (2010)	"Ice Cream" (2011)	"My Machines" (2011)

"Ice Cream" is the first and lead single by American experimental rock band, Battles featuring Chilean-German musical artist, Matias Aguayo, off their second studio album, Gloss Drop via Warp Records.

Released on May 23, 2011, the physical version of the single features three limited edition variants of cover art and matching vinyl (in Strawberry, Banana and Chocolate). and consists of an additional instrumental of the song and a b-side, entitled "Black Sundome".

The music video, released May 9 2011, was directed and produced by Luís Cerveró and Spanish production collective, CANADA respectively and features a random series of vignettes and scenes unrelated to one another, intercut with the group and Aguayo performing the song.

The video has been noted for being visually reminiscent of Spanish musical artist El Guincho's music video, Bombay (also produced by CANADA.)

Pitchfork placed "Ice Cream" at number 47 in its list of "The Top 100 Tracks of 2011".

== Track listing ==
No.	Title	Length
1.	"Ice Cream" (featuring Matias Aguayo)	4:36
2.	"Black Sundome"	2:44
3.	"Ice Cream (Instrumental)"	4:37
Total length:		11:57
