= Don Caballero =

American instrumental rock group

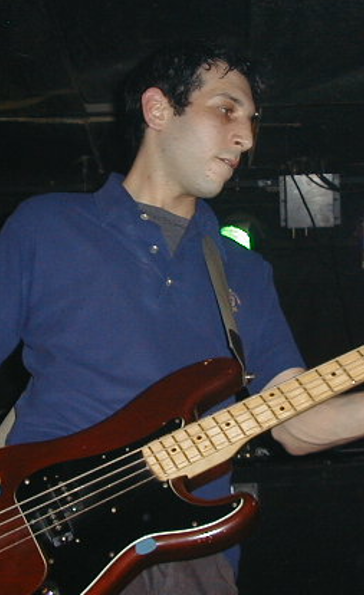
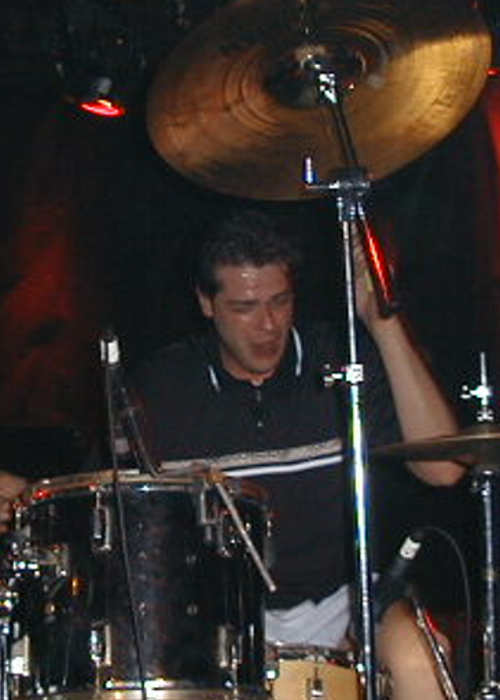
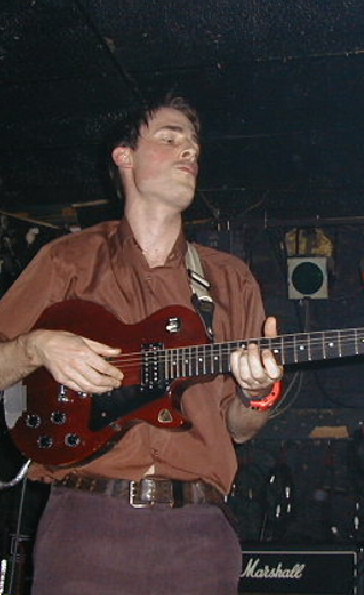
- American Don line-up; From left to right: Eric Emm, Damon Che, Ian Williams

Background information
- Also known as: Don Cab, The Don
- Origin: Pittsburgh, Pennsylvania
- Genres: Math rock; post-rock; post-progressive; post-hardcore
- Years active: 1991–2000; 2003–2009; 2026–present; (hiatus:1995–1997)
- Labels: Touch and Go; Relapse
- Spinoffs: Battles; Bellini; Storm & Stress
- Members: Damon Che; Ian Williams; Eric Emm
- Past members: Gene Doyle; Jason Jouver; Mike Banfield; Pat Morris; Dave Reid; George Draguns; Matt Jencik; Jeff Ellsworth
- Website: Don Caballero's official Facebook

Don Caballero (often shortened by members as 'Don Cab') is an American math rock band from Pittsburgh, Pennsylvania.

Although the band has had numerous lineup changes with co-founder Damon Che (drums and percussion) being the only constant member, the band's classic lineup consisted of Che, Ian Williams (guitar), Pat Morris (bass guitar), and Mike Banfield (guitar).

Formed in 1991 as a trio, the band released two singles in 1992. Williams joined the band the same year during the production of their debut album For Respect which was released in 1993 to positive reviews. Morris shortly left after the album's release and was replaced by bassists Matt Jencik, Dave Reid, George Draguns from 1993 to 1996 respectively. In 1995, the band under the lineup of Jencik, Williams, Banfield, and Che released their second album Don Caballero 2 to critical acclaim. After the release of Don Caballero 2, the group went on hiatus for two years.

The core lineup reformed in 1997 to release What Burns Never Returns to further critical acclaim. The following year, Morris departed again and was replaced by bassist Eric Emm. Banfield soon followed in 1999 and the band became a trio for the second time since its original inception. In 2000, Don Caballero released their fourth album American Don which featured a less aggressive sound than their previous albums. American Don received critical acclaim with critics considering it to be among their best work. The band split the same year due to tensions between Williams and Che. In 2003, Che reformed the band with guitarists Jeff Ellsworth and Gene Doyle along with bassist Jason Jouver. They released World Class Listening Problem in 2006 and Punkgasm in 2008 both to mixed reviews. In 2009, the band disbanded again. In 2026, they announced that the line-up of Che, Williams and Emm would be reuniting.

Considered pioneers of the 90's underground math rock movement along with bands Slint, Chavez, and Shellac, they developed a cult following during their career and are considered to be widely influential.

== History ==
The group's original lineup consisted of Damon Che (drums), Mike Banfield (guitars), and Pat Morris (bass guitar). Its members originally intended to draft a singer to join the group. However, their early rehearsals generated such interest that the trio was offered paying gigs and decided to remain instrumental.

The group took its name from the character Guy Caballero, portrayed by Joe Flaherty, on the sketch comedy show Second City Television. In SCTV's parody of the film The Godfather, Guy Caballero is called "Don Caballero".

Che's energetic and unconventional style of drumming was often praised, and earned him the informal title of "The Octopus" due to the wild flailing of his arms while playing. Critic Steve Huey wrote that "it was Che's manic explosions and stop-on-a-dime shifts in time signature that mapped out the trail his bandmates followed."

A recording session with Steve Albini and a deal with the prestigious Chicago-based label Touch and Go Records yielded yet another single and then finally their debut album, 1993's For Respect.

In the fall of 1993 bass player Pat Morris left Don Caballero to form the band Six Horse with Louisville transplant Shannon Burns and Blunderbuss drummer Bill Baxter. Throughout 1994 and 1995 a number of Pittsburgh-area musicians filled the bass slot in Don Caballero including Len Jarabeck, Dave Reid, Matt Jencik, and George Draguns.

In 1995 the band released its second LP Don Caballero 2. The liner notes of the album's promotional CD stated that "Don Caballero is rock not jazz. Don Caballero is free of solos."

In the wake of Don Caballero's second full-length, Che and Williams expanded their respective musical palettes: Che with Speaking Canaries (featuring bassist Karl Hendricks and drummer Noah Leger) and Williams with Storm & Stress, an experimental rock trio featuring bassist Eric Emm (Tanlines) and drummer Kevin Shea.

In 1997 the group reconvened after an almost two-year hiatus, with original bassist Pat Morris back in the fold. In the following year the band released the follow-up to Don Caballero 2, What Burns Never Returns.

In the fall of 1998 Pat Morris left the band once again and was replaced by Storm & Stress bassist Eric Emm. The band set out on a number of successful U.S. and European tours and finally released a collection of its singles and compilation tracks called Singles Breaking Up (Vol. 1). During this period, Mike Banfield retired from the group; former Bitch Magnet guitarist Jon Fine briefly filled in and allowed Don Caballero to complete its touring obligations in support of What Burns....

=== 1999–2000: Tensions, final years, Williams's departure ===
==== American Don ====
The band, once again a trio and now based out of Chicago, toured extensively throughout 1999 and 2000, including a performance in Toronto, playing a set of almost all-new material. To fill the void left by Banfield, Williams and Emm played through Akai Headrush pedals that allowed them to loop and layer their parts. These nine new songs were committed to tape by Steve Albini at his Electrical Audio recording studio and released in the fall of 2000 as American Don.

==== Van accident and dissolution ====
While touring in support of American Don in November 2000, tensions between Williams and Che mounted and fatigue took their toll on the members of Don Caballero and they decided to break up after the tour was completed. The band never made it to what would have been its final show in Detroit on November 21, however, as its van hit a patch of ice on Interstate 75, spun out of control and crashed into a semi truck. The entire tour was documented by musician Fred Weaver, opening act for the band, in his article "The Dark Final Days of Don Caballero" for Chunklet magazine.

Throughout 2001 and 2002, the former members of Don Caballero embarked on a variety of new musical projects: Damon Che with Bellini, Ian Williams with Battles, Eric Emm with Good Morning, and Pat Morris with The Poison Arrows.

=== 2003–2009: New lineup ===
==== World Class Listening Problem ====
Che reformed Don Caballero in 2003 with an entirely new lineup consisting of members of Pittsburgh's Creta Bourzia. The new members were Jeff Ellsworth on guitar, Gene Doyle on guitar, and Jason Jouver on bass. (Mike Banfield and Pat Morris were invited to participate but both declined).

The new Don Caballero signed with the heavy metal label Relapse Records in 2005 and released the album World Class Listening Problem in early 2006. The group toured in support of the album throughout 2006 and 2007, playing its first shows in the United Kingdom and Japan.

==== Punkgasm ====
Jeff Ellsworth left Don Caballero in 2006 and the remaining trio debuted several new songs (or "New Shapes" as they called them) in 2007, some of which featured vocals courtesy of Damon Che. The group recorded this new set of music at Rust Belt Recorders in Royal Oak, Michigan in early 2008 and released it as Punkgasm on August 19, 2008. The record contained some ideas taken from the Speaking Canaries sessions. Doyle sang on one of the tracks, Che sang on "Dirty Looks", while the title track "Punkgasm" featured Che on guitar and Doyle on drums. The album is the only of Don Caballero's to feature vocals.

==== Post-breakup ====
Don Caballero has not released new music since 2009, but it has released three albums of archival recordings: Gang Banged With a Headache, and Live (recorded live 2003; released 2012); Five Pairs of Crazy Pants. Wear 'Em: Early Caballero (the band's earliest studio recordings from 1991; released 2014); and Look at Them Ellie Mae Wrists Go!: Live Early Caballero (the band's second live show, recorded 1992; released 2014).

In a 2014 interview with Noisey: Music by Vice, Damon Che indicated that Don Caballero technically still existed as a part-time band, and mulled over the possibility of limited touring and a series of 12-inch vinyl singles in the future. However, in a 2017 appearance on The Trap Set podcast, Che spoke of Don Caballero entirely in the past tense and indicated that the group "stopped playing" after a final show in Spain in 2009.

In 2021, an official Don Caballero YouTube channel was created, featuring new videos of Damon Che playing drum covers of the band's discography. This coincided with Che starting a GoFundMe to help pay for the costs of digitizing all of the Don Caballero master tapes, which he had been in possession of for more than 30 years, before they started to degrade. The GoFundMe page has now finished its donation mark, and Che has made a video thanking the donators with one part of the video saying that new material will hopefully come out.

In 2024, Che recorded and released an album with El Ten Eleven bassist Kristian Dunn under the band name Yesness on Joyful Noise Recordings: See You At The Solipsist Convention.

=== 2026–present: Second reformation ===
On October 5, 2026, the band announced that the American Don line-up of Che, Williams and Emm would be reforming at Primavera Sound in 2027.

== Musical style ==
Don Caballero was generally regarded as a math rock band that was heavily influenced by jazz and jazz fusion. They are said to have expanded upon the works of influences such as Bastro, Bitch Magnet, and Slint. Other major influences include progressive rock and jazz fusion bands such as King Crimson, Soft Machine, Rush, and Mahavishnu Orchestra; other bands that have been cited by the members as influences include Melvins, Polvo, and Stone Temple Pilots. The band utilized time signature changes, dynamic shifts, and dissonant and complex guitar interplay. The band's songs were carefully crafted, and did not include improvisation.

== Legacy ==
Tomas Haake from Meshuggah and Dave Konopka from Battles have both named What Burns Never Returns as one of their favorite albums, and guitarist Marnie Stern has cited a video of a Don Caballero performance as the inspiration behind her extensive usage of two-handed tapping. The track "Chief Sitting Duck" from the album For Respect was featured in the second season intro for the reality show Buzzkill on MTV and the program Icon featured their music more than three years after their 2000 breakup.

== Band members ==
Current members

- Damon Che Fitzgerald – drums (1991–2000, 2003–2009, 2026–present)
- Ian Williams – guitar (1992–2000, 2026–present)
- Eric Emm – bass guitar (1998–2000, 2026–present)

Former members

- Mike Banfield – guitar (1991–1999)
- Pat Morris – bass guitar (1991–1993, 1997–1998)
- Matt Jencik – bass guitar (1993–1996)
- George Draguns – bass guitar (1993, 1994, 1995)
- Gene Doyle – guitar (2003–2009)
- Jason Jouver – bass guitar (2003–2009)
- Jeff Ellsworth – guitar (2003–2006)

Former touring members

- Leonard "Len" Jarabeck – bass guitar (1993)
- Dave Reid – bass guitar (1993)
- Jon Fine – guitar (1999)

== Discography ==
=== Studio albums ===
- For Respect (1993)
- Don Caballero 2 (1995)
- What Burns Never Returns (1998)
- American Don (2000)
- World Class Listening Problem (2006)
- Punkgasm (2008)

=== Compilations ===
- Singles Breaking Up (Vol. 1) (1999)

=== Singles & EPs ===
- "Lucky Father Brown" / "Belted Sweater" / "Shoeshine" 7-inch on Pop Bus (1992)
- "Unresolved Karma" / "Puddin' In My Eye" 7-inch on Broken Giraffe (1992)
- "Andandandandandandandand" / "First Hits" 7-inch on Third Gear (1993)
- "Our Caballero" / "My Ten-Year-Old Lady is Giving It Away" 7-inch on Touch and Go (1993)
- Our Caballero 12-inch/CD EP on City Slang (1993)
- "If You've Read Dr. Adder, Then You Know What I Want" 7-inch EP track on Coat-Tail (1995)
- "Waltor (live)" / "Shuman Center 91 (live)" 7-inch free with Chunklet No. 11 (1996)
- "Trey Dog's Acid" / "Room Temperature Lounge" 7-inch on Touch and Go (1998)
- "Got A Mile, Got A Mile, Got An Inch (live)" flexi 7-inch on Joyful Noise (2016)

Songs from all of Don Caballero's EPs (with the exception of the Chunklet and Joyful Noise singles) are collected on Singles Breaking Up (Vol. 1), released in 1999. Both songs from the Chunklet 7-inch were later included on Look At Them Ellie Mae Wrists Go! in 2014.

=== Live albums ===
- Gang Banged With a Headache, and Live (2012; recorded 2003)
- Five Pairs of Crazy Pants, Wear ‘Em: Early Don Caballero (2014; recorded 1991)
- Lookit Them Ellie May Wrists Go!: Live Early Caballero (2014; recorded 1992) bonus download
