= Tyondai Braxton =

American composer and musician

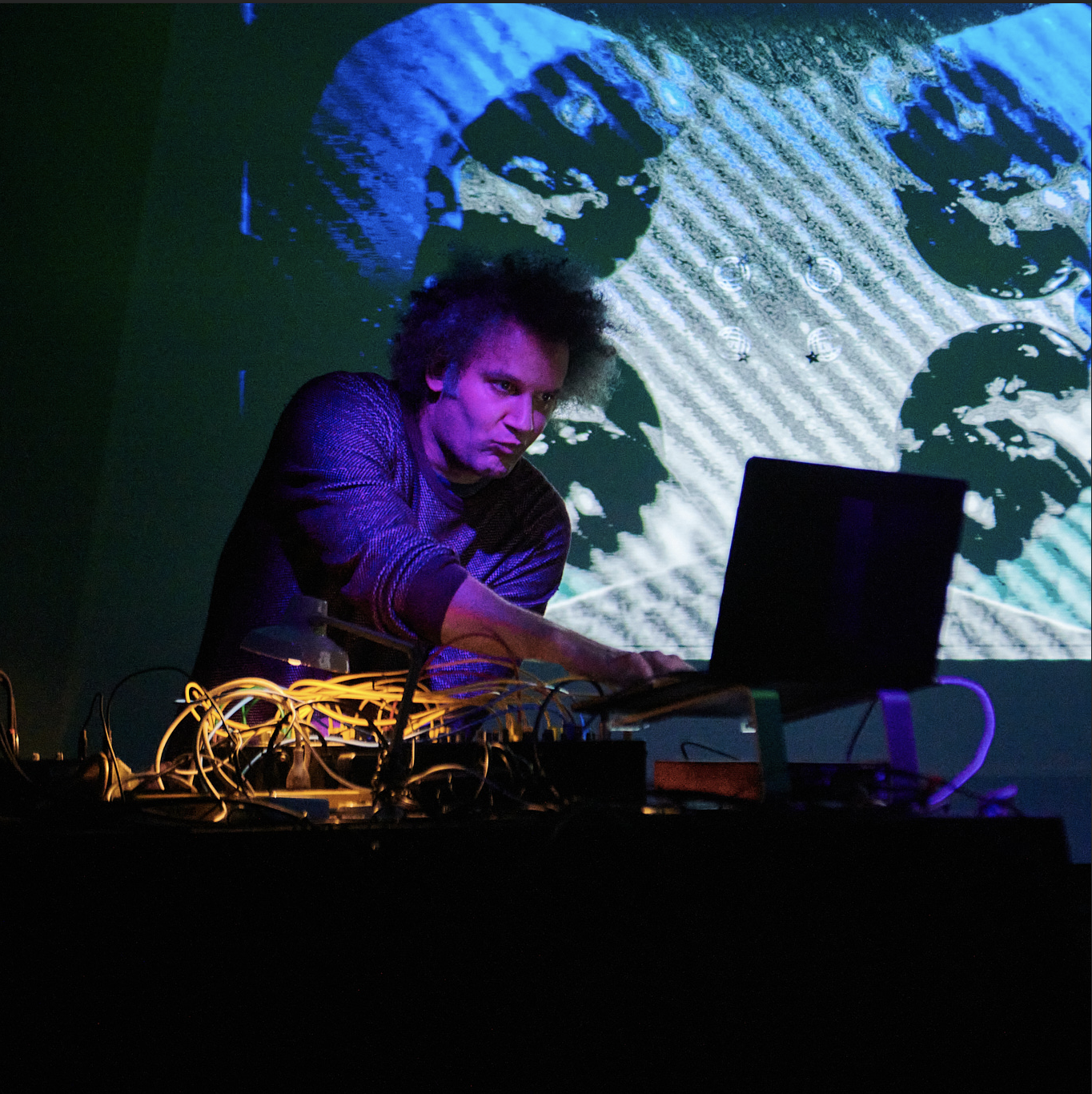
- Braxton, 2022

Background information
- Born: Tyondai Adaien Braxton; October 26, 1978 (age 48); New York City, New York, United States
- Genres: avant-garde, electronic, contemporary classical, experimental rock
- Occupation: Musician
- Years active: 1998–present
- Labels: Warp, Nonesuch
- Formerly of: Battles
- Website: tyondaibraxton.com

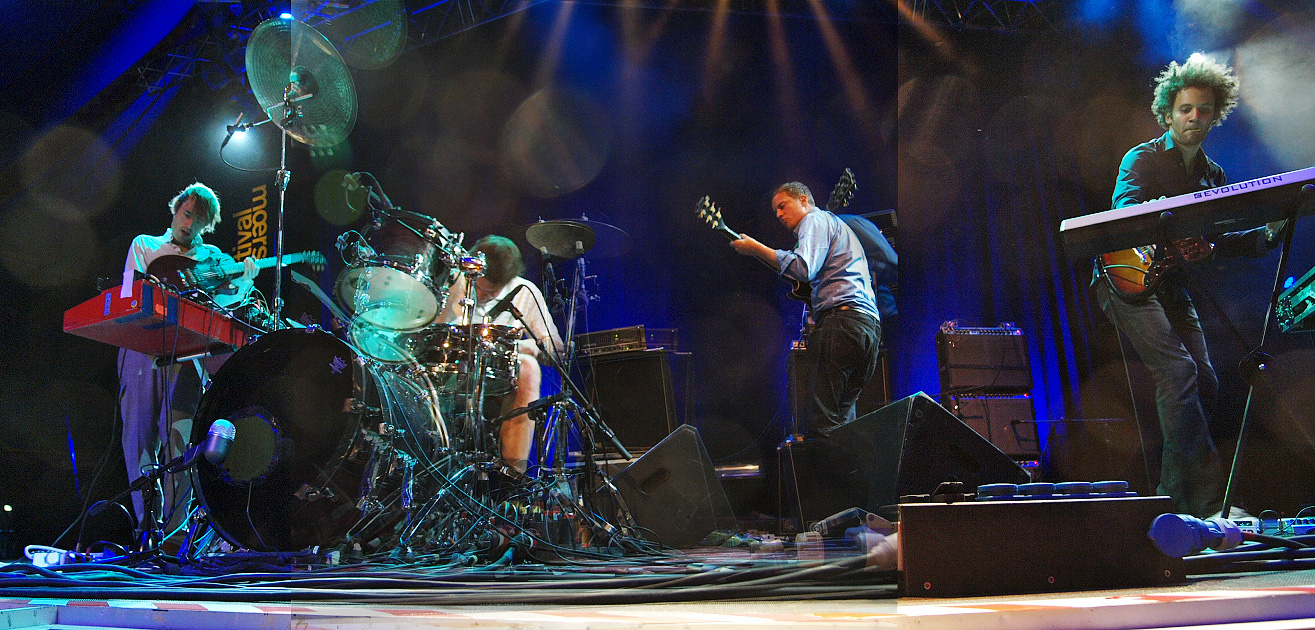
Tyondai Braxton with Battles, Moers Festival 2008

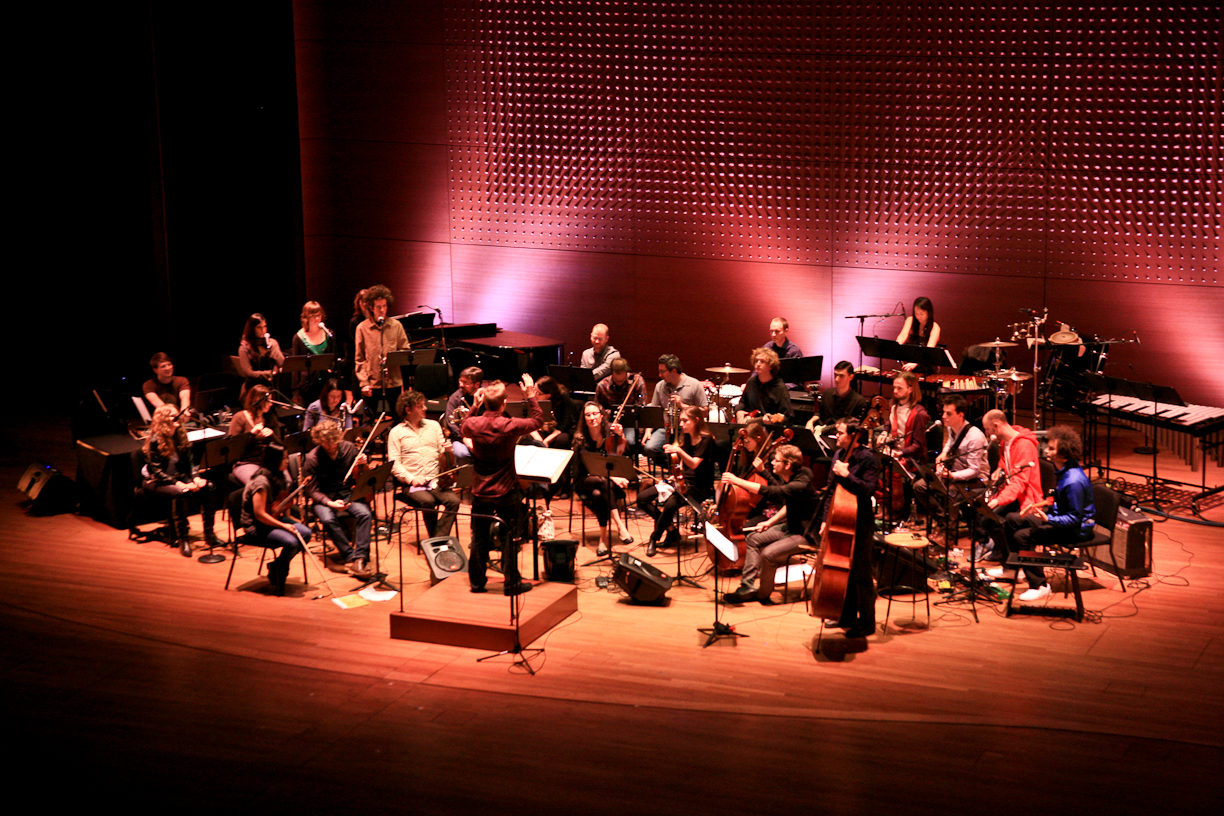
Tyondai Braxton & the Wordless Music Orchestra perform Central Market at Alice Tully Hall 2011

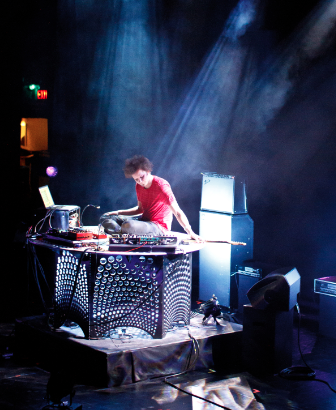
Braxton performing at the Brooklyn Academy of Music, 2012

Tyondai Adaien Braxton (born October 26, 1978) is an American composer and musician. He has composed and performed music under his own name and collaboratively since the mid-1990s, including in the experimental rock group Battles from its formation in 2002 until his departure from the group in 2010.

== Early life ==
As a teen, Braxton took musical inspiration from alternative rock bands like Nirvana and Sonic Youth, as well as from electronic music. He studied composition at the Hartt School of the University of Hartford in West Hartford, Connecticut, where his teachers included Robert Carl, Ingram Marshall, and Ken Steen. He is the son of composer Anthony Braxton and has cited early exposure to recordings by Karlheinz Stockhausen and John Coltrane as being influential.

== Career ==
=== Early solo work and Battles (2000–2009) ===
After receiving his degree, Braxton moved to New York City in 2000. He became active in New York City's experimental music scene, developing a solo practice centered on guitar, voice, effects pedals, and live looping. His performances used layers of recorded and processed sound to create dense, evolving textures, establishing an approach to electronic composition and sound design that would remain central throughout his career. During this period he released an album of solo electronic music History That Has No Effect on JMZ Records (2002).

In 2002, Braxton co-founded the experimental rock band Battles with Ian Williams, Dave Konopka, and John Stanier. The band used electronics, effects processing, and unconventional performance techniques, resulting in a sound that combined elements of experimental rock, electronic music, and contemporary composition. Following the release of a series of EPs, the group gained international recognition with Mirrored (2007), released on Warp Records which was hailed by Time and Pitchfork as among the ten best records of the year and established the group as one of the most acclaimed independent bands of the decade. Extensive international touring followed, including appearances at major festivals such as Glastonbury, Brian Eno's Luminous Festival, Coachella, and Fuji Rock.

=== Orchestral works, commissions, and HIVE (2009–2018) ===
Braxton's second solo album, Central Market (2009), marked a shift toward orchestral and electroacoustic composition. Released on Warp Records and performed with the Wordless Music Orchestra, the work combined chamber orchestra, electronics, and unorthodox approach to studio production. The album's name is a nod to both Igor Stravinsky's Petrushka (the fairytale-like bazaar that opens that ballet) and the worldwide market crash of 2008. It was subsequently performed by orchestras throughout the world including BBC Symphony Orchestra, London Sinfonietta and the Los Angeles Philharmonic and was later adapted into the ballet Closing Bell by choreographer John Heginbotham.

Following his departure from Battles, Braxton focused increasingly on commissions for ensembles, orchestras, and interdisciplinary projects. Works from this period include TREMS for Bang on a Can All-Stars, "Uffe's Woodshop" reorchestrated for string quartet for Kronos Quartet, Music for Ensemble & Pitch Shifter / Delay for new music ensemble Yarn/Wire, and Fly By Wire, a chamber orchestra work commissioned by Carnegie Hall for Alarm Will Sound. During this period Braxton also collaborated with artists including German electronic duo Mouse on Mars, visual artist Thomas Demand, and composer Philip Glass, performing as a duo at the 2012 edition of All Tomorrow's Parties in New York City.

Beginning in the early 2010s, Braxton expanded his use of electronic systems in both performance and composition. These interests culminated in HIVE, a multimedia work commissioned by Works & Process at the Solomon R. Guggenheim Museum and premiered in the rotunda of the museum in 2013. Combining modular synthesizers, percussion and performance structures designed by artist Uffe Surland Van Tams, the work toured internationally, including at Oval Space in London, Sacrum Profanum in Krakow, Mutek in Montreal and the Sydney Opera House in Sydney, Australia. Material developed for the project formed the basis of HIVE1 (2015), Braxton's debut release for Nonesuch Records, followed by the Oranged Out EP in 2016.

=== Telekinesis, recent works, and academic career (2018–present) ===
In 2018, Braxton premiered Telekinesis, a large work for electric guitars, orchestra, choir, and electronics, with the BBC Concert Orchestra and BBC Singers with André de Ridder conducting at Queen Elizabeth Hall in London. Co-commissioned by Southbank Centre and Musica nova Helsinki, the piece was subsequently performed by the Finnish Radio Symphony Orchestra in Helsinki, Finland again with de Ridder in 2019. A studio recording featuring Metropolis Ensemble, Brooklyn Youth Chorus, and The Crossing was released in 2022 by Nonesuch and New Amsterdam Records.

In 2022, Braxton joined the faculty of Princeton University, where he teaches composition.

Works composed during this period include Vacancy (2022), a work for chamber orchestra and electronics commissioned by the German ensemble Stargaze and Sunny X (2023), a work for percussion quartet and electronics commissioned by Third Coast Percussion was premiered at Carnegie Hall. Drawing on Braxton's continuing interest in percussion and electronic music, the work was subsequently released on Third Coast Percussion's album Between Breaths.

Since 2023 he has presented a new body of electronic work at venues and festivals in Europe and North America. This material formed the basis of Splayed Werks (2026), released by Erased Tapes Records, a studio album centered on modular synthesis, electronic composition, and live-performance-derived material.

== Discography ==
=== Studio albums ===
- History That Has No Effect (2002) JMZ
- Central Market (2009) Warp
- HIVE1 (2015) Nonesuch
- Telekinesis (2022) Nonesuch
- Splayed Werks (2026) Erased Tapes

=== EPs ===
- Oranged Out E.P (2016), Beatink Records

=== Select recordings ===
- Casino Trem (2015) featured on Bang on a Can All-Stars Field Recordings Cantaloupe Music
- Music for Ensemble & Pitchshifter Delay (2017) featured on Yarn/Wire Currents 0
- ArpRec1 (2017) featured on Brooklyn Rider Spontaneous Symbols In A Circle Records
- Vacancy (2022) featured on Stargaze One Transgressive Records
- Sunny X (2023) featured on Third Coast Percussion Between Breaths Cedille Records

=== Battles ===
- EP C (Monitor Records; June 8, 2004)
- B EP (Dim Mak Records; September 14, 2004)
- EPC (Japan only special mix edition; Dotlinecircle; October 2004)
- EP C/B EP (Warp; February 6, 2006)
- Mirrored (Warp; May 14, 2007)
- Lives (Limited edition CD; Beat Records; September 27, 2007)
- Tonto+ (Warp; October 22, 2007)
- Warp20 (Chosen) (Warp; September 29, 2009)
- Twilight Saga: Eclipse OST (On "The Line"; Chop Shop Records; June 8, 2010)

=== Collaborative releases ===
- Tyondai Braxton and Jonathan Matis Death Slug 2000 (2000)
- Parts & Labor and Tyondai Braxton split LP Rise, Rise, Rise (2003), Narnack Records
- Various Artists Rework Philip Glass Remixed (2012), Orange Mountain Music - Rubric Remix
- Mouse on Mars 21 Again, (2000) - Off Sea Monkeytown Records
- Dirty Projectors Self-titled (2017), Domino Records
