= EPC =

EPC may refer to:

== Government and politics ==
- Eastern Provincial Council, in Sri Lanka
- European Patent Convention, a treaty instituting a legal system for granting European patents
- European Patrol Corvette, a project for a class of surface combatant promoted by the European Council in 2019
- European Policy Centre, a Belgian think tank
- Proposed European Political Community (1952), intended to be a directly-elected body
- European Political Community, from 2022, an intergovernmental forum
- European Political Cooperation, 1970–1993, co-ordination of foreign policy

== Biology ==
- Early Prostate Cancer programme
- Endothelial progenitor cell
- × Epicattleya, an orchid genus
- Experimental Psychology Conference, run annually in Australia or New Zealand
- Extra-pair copulation

== Technology and business ==
=== Computing ===
- Asus Eee PC, netbook computers
- Electronic Poetry Center
- Electronic Product Code
- Evolved Packet Core, part of the System Architecture Evolution, in telecommunications

=== Engineering ===
- EPC Group, a German engineering and construction company
- Engineering, procurement, and construction contract
- Execution Phase Contracts, see Front-end engineering

=== Transportation ===
- European Patrol Corvette, a project for a class of surface combatant promoted by the European Council in 2019
- Class designation for Reading electric multiple units

=== Other uses in technology and business ===
- EPC Groupe, a French explosives company
- Edgewell Personal Care, a US company
- Energy Performance Certificate
- European Patent Convention, a treaty instituting a legal system for granting European patents
- European Payments Council, an international not-for-profit association representing European payment service providers
- Event-driven process chain, in process modeling
- Export Promotion Council, a Kenyan trade group

== Arts ==
- EPC (EP), by Battles
- Electronic Poetry Center

== Other uses ==
- European Paralympic Committee
- Evangelical Presbyterian Church (disambiguation)

== See also ==
- EP C, by Battles
