= The Yabba =

Single by Battles

from the album La Di Da Di
- Released: August 13, 2015
- Genre: Experimental rock; math rock; instrumental rock
- Length: 6:49
- Label: Warp
- Songwriter(s): Ian Williams, John Stanier, Dave Konopka
- Producer(s): Battles; Keith Souza; Seth Manchester

Battles singles chronology
"My Machines" (2011)	"The Yabba" (2015)	"FF Bada" (2015)

Music video
- "The Yabba" on YouTube

"The Yabba" is a song by American experimental rock group Battles. It was released on August 13, 2015 on Warp Records as the lead single from their third studio album, La Di Da Di. Preceding its commercial release, the song was performed during a live session along with four other songs from La Di Da Di on June 26, 2015. The performance was streamed online in a 24-hour loop on the band's website and was directed by David Raboy.

== Music video ==
The music video for "The Yabba" was released on September 9, 2015 and features the band members playing in various settings. Tom Breihan of Stereogum described the video, saying, "It opens with an image of an unnaturally still woman, in ’70s costume, spinning a basketball on her finger. But the clip mostly focuses on the three members of the band, hard at work, bashing out the song in an outdoor desertscape or surrounded by their own light screens. Sometimes, they’re surrounded by a group of creepily expressionless onlookers." The video was directed by Roger Guàrdia.

== Track listing ==
Digital download
No.	Title	Length
1.	"The Yabba"	6:49
