= Edith Prickley =

Fictional character from SCTV

- Second City Television character
- Prickley on the cover of an SCTV DVD, with Guy Caballero.
- Portrayed by: Andrea Martin

In-universe information
- Gender: Female
- Occupation: Television station manager

Edith Prickley was a character in all six seasons of the Canadian sketch comedy series SCTV. Created and played by Andrea Martin, the character took over as the station manager for the fictional television station Second City Television, based out of a city called Melonville, and serving the "tri-city area". Prickley, visibly distinct by her leopard-print clothing and hat, and rhinestone studded glasses, worked for the station's president and owner, Guy Caballero.

The role remains perhaps Martin's best known. In 1982, her SCTV work as Edith and other characters earned an Emmy nomination in the category "Outstanding Supporting Actress in a Comedy or Variety or Music Series".

== Personality ==
According to the book "Women in Comedy", one writer described Edith as "an amalgam of Rona Barrett, Joan of Arc, and Auntie Mame". The "oversexed" Prickley was convinced that every male around had "lustful intention towards her". Prickley snorted at her own jokes; her laugh has been described as a cackle.

The Second City website reads: "Ms. Prickley had all the style of Jackie O. and all the charm of Jackie Mason."

== History of the character ==
Martin originated Edith on stage as part of an improvised skit:

When I was doing Second City in Toronto, we'd bring in clothes from home, and they would be backstage. And during the improv section of the show, there'd be suggestions from the audience. Catherine O'Hara had brought in her mom's 1950s leopard jacket and hat. It was on the coat rack. One of the suggestions that night was a parent-teacher conference. And it was supposed to be for delinquent kids. The parents were supposed to be more immature than the kids were. So I came to the door [in the leopard outfit], and Catherine was the teacher, and she said, "You must be Mrs. Prickley?" And I said [doing her Edith Prickley voice], "That's right dear. Edith's the name, Sebastian's the game."

According to the Prickley character in the comedy special Andrea Martin: Together Again, she was married to Mr. Prickley in 1969. Prickley's sister was Edna Boil (also played by Andrea Martin) proprietor of Edna's Prairie Warehouse and Curio Emporium, an advertiser on SCTV. Though she was routinely addressed as "Mrs. Prickley", her husband Ken was never seen and infrequently referenced; few details other than his name were ever revealed about him. Though she stayed married throughout her run on SCTV, Edith also openly and unrepentantly dated outside of her marriage, including a couple of dates with Canadian prime minister Pierre Trudeau (portrayed by Martin Short).

Prickley first appeared on SCTV in a Sunrise Semester sketch aired as part of the first season episode 17, Galaxy 66. Prickley appears in regards to "Elevator Conversation". Later in the episode, she appears to advertise Mrs. Prickley's Jams Jellies and Preserves, stating: "I hope you choke on it." Aside from a repeat of the ad in episode 23, she wouldn't officially appear again until season 2. Martin's one-off character in episode 25, Princess Carlotta, was essentially Edith Prickley, without her name or leopard print. The character appeared in the two part "Morning Facial with Princess Carlotta", credited as "A Johnny LaRue Production".

In episode 10 of season 2, which aired November 18, 1978, station owner Guy Caballero chooses to promote Edith Prickley to SCTV station manager, replacing the kidnapped Moe Green. She announces her programming intentions as "boobs, bums, good-looking hunky guys, and no more sports".

The character appeared in various movies throughout the series' run, including Gangway for Miracles and Give 'Em Hell, Bess.

In the 1988 special The Best of SCTV, Caballero and Prickley appeared before a Congressional hearing room, to defend their practices, in order to renew the station's license.

As of 1989, Prickley was a bartender, serving Andrea Martin in the comedy special Andrea Martin: Together Again.

== Appearances off SCTV ==
Prickley occasionally appeared outside of SCTV, ranging from a run of appearances on Sesame Street (including as an animated character) to various stage appearances.

- 1980: Prickley appears as the mother of a failing grade school student in the pilot episode of "From Cleveland", a sketch show featuring other SCTV cast members, as well as the comic duo of Bob & Ray. The pilot aired on CBS on Friday, October 24, 1980 at 11:30 PM and afterwards was not picked up for a regular series.
- 1987: Prickley appears on the CBC broadcast Canadian Sesame Street, later known as Sesame Park.
- 1989: Martin's Showtime comedy special Andrea Martin: Together Again features her as herself, and as various characters. The special is presented as Andrea Martin talks to Edith, about her just finished special.
- November 14, 1989: Martin appears as Edith Prickley on Sesame Street. Prickley is a shoe salesperson, who attempts to sell to Grundgetta and Maria Figueroa. The character also appeared in a celebrity-filled version of the song "Put Down the Duckie". SCTV characters Yosh Shmenge (John Candy) and Ed Grimley (Martin Short) also appeared on Sesame Street.
- 1996: Martin appears in a one-woman show in the East Village, at the Papp Public Theater. Along with appearing as herself, she appears as various characters, including Prickley.
- 1998: The Elmo's World segment of Sesame Street debuts. An animated version of Edith Prickley (voiced by Martin) appears as a personality on numerous narrow-themed channels seen on the TV, but isn't named as Prickley. The character would later evolve in appearance.
- 1999: Prickley appears in a television special called Just for Laughs: Montreal Comedy Festival, taped at the Just for Laughs festival.
- May 2008: Martin appears as Edith Prickley in the two-performance SCTV reunion stage show "The Benefit of Laughter".
- April 2017: Appearing on Late Night With Seth Meyers, Martin performed a rap (as Edith Prickley) from her one-woman show Final Days, Everything Must Go, written by Lin-Manuel Miranda.

== See also ==
- The Second City
- Guy Caballero
- Ed Grimley
