= Gloss Drop =

Studio album by Battles
- Released: 6 June 2011
- Recorded: 2010–11, Machines with Magnets, Pawtucket, Rhode Island
- Genres: Experimental rock; math rock
- Length: 53:50
- Label: Warp

Battles chronology
Tonto+ (2007)	Gloss Drop (2011)	Dross Glop (2012)

Singles from Gloss Drop
- 1. "Ice Cream" Released: 23 May 2011; 2. "My Machines" Released: 15 August 2011

Gloss Drop is the second studio album by American experimental rock band Battles, released on Warp Records in June 2011.

Most of the album is instrumental, but vocals are provided by various guests performers, including electronic musician Gary Numan and Blonde Redhead's Kazu Makino.

"Ice Cream" was the first single to be released from the album on 23 May 2011, in both digital and 12" vinyl formats. The vinyl was limited to 3000 copies, and was released in three different "flavors," with "strawberry" (pink), "vanilla" (cream), and "chocolate" (brown) colored records. Barcelona-based directorial collective CANADA produced a video for the single. It includes the B-side "Black Sundome" and an instrumental version of "Ice Cream". The second single released was for "My Machines", featuring Gary Numan, which came in digital and vinyl formats with an instrumental version of the song and an album outtake, "A.M. Gestalt".

From February to April 2012, a series of four 12" vinyl EPs were issued, titled Dross Glop (a spoonerism of the title) 1 through 4, featuring remixes of all the songs on Gloss Drop by various artists. A compilation featuring the 11 remixes (plus one not included, "Sundome") was released on 16 April 2012.

== Artwork ==
The album cover is a photo of a sculpture constructed out of Great Stuff, a commercial foam insulator, by guitarist Dave Konopka. Dave: "The artwork is a sculpture that I did, I'm even reluctant to say sculpture... it's a sculpture that I made during the making of the album and essentially it's a big pink blob, of nothing. I wanted to represent a solid document that would be the album, that is a controlled atmosphere and have something that is completely organic that you can't even control the way things are going to happen, and at the end of the day it was more evident that we couldn't control anything other than the way things were going to happen when it came to making this album. So the actual artwork was just this blob... I made this controlled square one that didn't look as good but the organic blob that just fell into place and then congealed and solidified, was the total proper way for us to go for the album."

== Writing process ==
The writing for Gloss Drop was completed from 2010 to 2011. Midway through the process, Tyondai Braxton left the band to pursue his solo career. The band then carried on as a trio and re-wrote the entire album within four months. Drummer John Stanier told BBC Radio: "We were working on this record but nobody was happy with it. Even he [Braxton] wasn't happy with it, it just sounded terrible, it was really bad. Once he left, after the initial shock of 'what are we going to do', all of a sudden it’s like wait, no, now this song sounds awesome because there aren’t these ridiculous, terrible vocals on it now, to be honest."

=== Dave Konopka on the album's songs ===
- "Africastle": "That song stuck out for us as a good opener because of the pacing of it and the way that everything just kicks in. It was a great way to open up the album after a four-year hiatus from our last recorded piece. It was definitely the ideal opener for the album."
- "Ice Cream": "We asked Matias Aguayo to guest as a vocalist on this particular track. He kind of matched the level of sexiness that the song required. There was kind of an underlying level of sexiness that the song had and he kind of brought that out a little bit more."
- "Futura": "There was this minimal thing that was going on there and there was this pacing that was like taking turns. I know a lot of Battles songs can be like a leap-frog process of just playing on top of each other and it creates this overall texture, but this song was really more about the entrances and it was almost like... a tide, for me, it has this semi-hip-hop tide which I really like about it."
- "Inchworm": "We were in the studio for the first half of the year and we had a setback when we lost a member, and we went home for a little bit but when we went home we made sure we weren't going to be complacent, so I recorded this. I set up and just played this one riff and just altering the source material of that same riff and just working with this loop, and this was like a two-hour jam with a dancey-type vibe. The key to it was to translate that as a band and John [Stanier] added that reggaeton beat and Ian [Williams] brought in all his bass lines and that song was a really successful under pressure-type song that I think is really important for the scope of the album."
- "Wall Street": "That song was one of Ian's babies we recorded in the same studio as Mirrored, Machines with Magnets, with the same engineers, and because we were under pressure to get the album done, we separated into three different rooms and would record our parts direct, through all of our effects and then we'd feed that into the live room and the engineers took on more of a production role to kind of find the sounds for us and re-amp stuff as we kept cranking out more material. Really Ian was like, 'Alright, I keep envisioning these '80s stockbrokers at the pinnacle of their success partying on a yacht' and he was like 'Yeah, this song's got to be all about success' and he kept pushing that visualization, so we decided to call it 'Wall Street'."
- "My Machines": "The title was taken from the lyrics of Gary Numan. I remember John saying 'We should totally ask Gary Numan to sing on the album' which was a total shot in the dark because we didn't think there was any way of getting him to be on the album. We drove up to Boston and he was playing The Pleasure Principle, and we got to see him after the show and it was bizarre... like us just stood outside his dressing room and his manager was like 'Okay, you want to come in and meet Gary?' and we were like 'Yeah, that would be great', and we had a CD for him so we went in and he was like 'Hi, I'm Gary, pleased to meet you' and we were like 'Hi, nice to meet you' and he said 'Yeah, I've listened to your track, I like it a lot... it's really fucking weird' and we were like '...Gary Numan's telling us that we're weird' and it was like this is a moment I'm never going to forget. But he was awesome to work with and a total charm."
- "Dominican Fade": "It's named after a hair cut in the United States. It existed from a little jam that John and I had together that we kept working on in the rehearsal space, and it was like maybe it will be cool to have this little bride in between songs but then when we recorded it and he put his drums and all this extra percussion on... like he plays a, cast iron skillet. So then we were like, this song's a lot doper than we thought it was going to be and it's a really simple, almost like an EP-type song and that was really important to harness some of that energy from our EPs, our first recordings and Ian put some more percussive elements and keyboard parts that put the icing on the cake."
- "Sweetie & Shag": "We asked Kazu Makino from Blonde Redhead because she lives in New York and she has an amazing voice and great delivery and we've all been Blonde Redhead fans for years. She was awesome, she was like, 'This is part of your life document and I'm totally into helping you.' So she came up to the studio and rode up in the car with us and worked like all day. I think she had a little bit of a cold but she worked so hard to bring it all together and work out the melody and she was awesome, she was great."
- "Toddler": "It was just like this little ditty that Ian did and we thought it might be the beginning of 'White Electric' but we thought it was just this little kiss of just space in the album, and would be nice to have placed strategically, and we didn't really have a name for it... yeah, we didn't have a title for it and I just thought 'Toddler' would be a really cute name for that track. [laughs]"
- "Rolls Bayce": "I was running John's beats that he did through my guitar pedals, everything I was recording was within the BPM that fits within the song and I wrote a bass line to it and that's what that bass line is, that 'Rolls Bayce' and then Ian had this cool line that we called 'Ethiopian Ice Hockey' during the break, so it was just those things and we were like, 'If we can get away with writing a song out of this then it could be a good one.'"
- "White Electric": "It was the first song that we worked on for this album and I think that we were like so... trying to get into the mode of writing again that when we were first done with this track it was like 16–17 minutes long... we were like, 'Yeah, maybe for the first song on the album it should be a little shortened down' so that was like a constant work-in-progress because it was the first thing we worked on, but then all the way at the end of the process there was like a complete re-writing of it and I think that we felt that there was maybe a little bit of, we weren't flexing enough... whereas the album rocks, I don't think we were fixing the riffing rock enough, so by the end of the process we just wanted to get across a semi-metal type thing and it's also named after one of our favourite coffee shops in Providence, Rhode Island."
- "Sundome": "It's named after a basketball league in Jordan. The whole beginning of it is very organic and the whole song is like trying to find its shape and then it starts to slowly evolve, but at the other end of the spectrum you have very experimental bizarre vocals as instrument incorporated into the track. And we felt that who better to do that than Yamantaka Eye from Boredoms, and he was awesome... he just sent us this raw track and he was like, 'Do whatever you want to it.' And the vocals themselves were bizarre to us... because, we thought he was speaking Japanese, but he's just making up his own stuff and he's repeating stuff that he's making up which is so hard to do, and I love what he came through for with that track... it just brought it to another level."

== Reception ==
Professional ratings
Aggregate scores
Source	Rating
AnyDecentMusic?	7.4/10
Metacritic	79/100
Review scores
Source	Rating
AllMusic	4/5 stars
The A.V. Club	B
Chicago Tribune	3.5/4 stars
Entertainment Weekly	B+
The Guardian	3/5 stars
The Irish Times	4/5 stars
MSN Music (Expert Witness)	A−
NME	8/10
Pitchfork	7.4/10
Spin	9/10

Gloss Drop received generally positive reviews from most music critics upon its release. At AnyDecentMusic?, which collates reviews of contemporary music albums, the album received an average score of 7.4 (based on 23 reviews) rated highest by Spin and Clash magazines. Metacritic, another aggregation website, gave it a score of 79 out of 100, indicating 'generally favourable reviews', based on 37 professional reviews.

According to AllMusic, the tracks with guest singers "are Gloss Drops immediate standouts", due to the trio's way of picking singers "that reflect a particular aspect of their sound that they've chosen to express". "Gloss Drop may be more accomplished than the band's debut; even if it's not quite as much of a powerhouse as Mirrored was, it shows that the trio version of Battles is lean, creative, and surprisingly adaptable", reviewer Heather Phares concludes.

Mark Shukla of The Skinny, remarking on how adroitly the band overcame the departure of their former vocalist Tyondai Braxton, argued that "...above and beyond its considerable technical accomplishment, it's Gloss Drop's sense of playful optimism that augurs most auspiciously for this band's future." BBC Music, on the other hand, considers the loss of Braxton too heavy a blow for the band, citing "Ice Cream" as the one that "really shines". Spin called it "a triumphant moment, an experimental outburst both ingenious and accessible". Clash said it was 'sublime', 'startling', 'visually emotive' and 'vividly audacious'.

Amongst the more critical reviews, Dorain Lynsky from The Guardian stated that "there are dry, impenetrable patches, making Gloss Drop an album that ultimately impresses more than it charms." In a similar sentiment, Sam Walby from Drowned in Sound wrote that "There is no question that this is a technically adept, well realised and urgent recording, but what seems to be a lacking is the je ne sais quoi that made Mirrored such a colossal debut album." At BBC Music, Mike Diver opined that "Everything on Gloss Drop is excellently performed – the players are seasoned professionals, and with Battles a going concern since 2002 there was never going to be any sloppiness on show. However, whether this set represents a significant step onwards from Mirrored is questionable. When tracks remain instrumental, attentions can wander, and arguably there’s nothing here with the immediacy of the vocal-free Tras single of 2004. White Electric should raise many a pulse, and opener Africastle does everything the fair-weather Battles fan wants from them: it’s technically assured, tremendously structured, and you can dance to it. But the basic formulas remain much as they were almost a whole decade ago."

== Track listing ==
No.	Title	Length
1.	"Africastle"	5:45
2.	"Ice Cream" (featuring Matias Aguayo)	4:37
3.	"Futura"	6:17
4.	"Inchworm"	4:52
5.	"Wall Street"	5:25
6.	"My Machines" (featuring Gary Numan)	3:55
7.	"Dominican Fade"	1:48
8.	"Sweetie & Shag" (featuring Kazu Makino)	3:50
9.	"Toddler"	1:11
10.	"Rolls Bayce"	2:06
11.	"White Electric"	6:14
12.	"Sundome" (featuring Yamantaka Eye)	7:47
13.	"Afrislow" (MWM edit) (iTunes exclusive bonus track)	5:15

== Personnel ==
- Dave Konopka – bass, guitar, effects
- John Stanier – drums
- Ian Williams – guitar, keyboards
- Matias Aguayo – vocals
- Gary Numan – vocals
- Kazu Makino – vocals
- Yamantaka Eye – vocals

=== Production ===
- Battles – producer
- Keith Souza – producer, mixer
- Seth Manchester – producer, mixer
- Ryan Smith – mastering
- Dave Konopka – art direction
- Lesley Unruh – photography
- Warp Music – publisher
