= Juice B Crypts =

Studio album by Battles
- Released: October 18, 2019
- Genres: Experimental rock; electronic rock
- Length: 40:39
- Label: Warp
- Producer: Chris Tabron

Battles chronology
La Di Da Di (2015)	Juice B Crypts (2019)

Juice B Crypts is the fourth studio album by American experimental rock band Battles, produced by Chris Tabron, and released through Warp on October 16, 2019. It is the band's first album as a duo, following guitarist/bassist Dave Konopka's departure in 2018.

Battles toured Europe and North America from April to December 2019 in support of the album.

== Background ==
Guitarist Ian Williams stated that the album is about "chord progressions, resolutions, returning home" but also using a "blender of modern electronic tools like glitching devices" to "regurgitate" "melodic lines and [...] at the same time try and retain harmonic relationships while completely smashing them up". Warp described the album as "a sensory overload of information" featuring "synthesizer loops, cut-throat drum patterns, and cyclical riffs".

Yes frontman Jon Anderson, who sings on the track "Sugar Foot", was a fan of Battles and had offered to collaborate with the band. Drummer John Stanier said: "About eight or nine years ago, [Anderson]'s management contacted us or me: 'Jon Anderson from Yes wants you to play drums on one of these songs on his solo record. He is really into Battles.' It didn’t work out timing-wise or whatever. Then Jon Anderson emailed me back and was like, 'Love Battles. By the way, anytime you guys want to do a collabo, let me know. I’ll do vocals'."

The album's title was chosen by Williams' two children.

== Critical reception ==
Professional ratings
Aggregate scores
Source	Rating
AnyDecentMusic?	7.0/10
Metacritic	76/100
Review scores
Source	Rating
AllMusic	4/5 stars
Exclaim!	9/10
NME	4/5 stars
Pitchfork	6.1/10
Slant Magazine	3.5/5 stars

According to the review aggregator Metacritic, Juice B Crypts received "generally favorable reviews" based on a weighted average score of 76 out of 100 from 17 critic scores. Heather Phares from AllMusic compared the album favourably to the band's oeuvre, claiming that "Battles pack so much into Juice B Crypts that, perhaps more than any of their albums since Mirrored, it needs to be taken as a whole to appreciate its constantly changing, consistently engaging sounds."

Exclaim! critic Owen Torrey called the album "11 tracks of knotty, electronic rock puzzles", and wrote that from the start of the first song, "Ambulance", "Battles are back at the complex craft of building sequences out of repetition, alteration, layering", summarizing that it is "the sound of a band who continue to create after more than a decade — tempered with loss, yes, but also joy, also freedom". Writing for NME, Will Richards felt that Juice B Crypts is "an intricate and complex album that nonetheless bottles the joy and immediacy of the band's best work" as well as one that "indulges the weird and wonderful side of Battles while also, simply, giving the people what they want".

Seth Wilson was more reserved in the review for Slant, stating that the album "occasionally threatens to collapse beneath the weight of its overstuffed songs. But even when it’s too maximalist for its own good, Battles’s music is still compelling." In the review for Pitchfork, Grayson Harver Currin concluded that "Juice B Crypts is anti-gestalt music, where incredible parts are subsumed by wholes that try to do too much. You’re left to wonder if Stanier and Williams feel they have to prove themselves again. Or perhaps they’re aware that the polyglot power that made their early work so powerful is almost passé now, as the lines between genres corrode. Either way, Juice B Crypts is an act of overcompensation from a duo trying to make too much happen with less."

== Track listing ==
No.	Title	Length
1.	"Ambulance"	4:20
2.	"A Loop So Nice..."	2:14
3.	"They Played It Twice" (featuring Xenia Rubinos)	3:09
4.	"Sugar Foot" (featuring Jon Anderson & Prairie WWWW)	5:18
5.	"Fort Greene Park"	5:45
6.	"Titanium 2 Step" (featuring Sal Principato of Liquid Liquid)	3:26
7.	"Hiro 3"	1:08
8.	"Izm" (featuring Shabazz Palaces)	3:36
9.	"Juice B Crypts"	3:56
10.	"Last Supper on Shasta Pt. 1" (featuring Tune-Yards)	3:52
11.	"Last Supper on Shasta Pt. 2" (featuring Tune-Yards)	3:55
Total length:		40:39

== Personnel ==
Battles

- Ian Williams – keyboards, synthesizers, guitar, bass, effects, Ableton push, composer
- John Stanier – drums, percussion, composer

Additional musicians

- Tune-Yards – vocals, instrumentation
- Sal Principato – vocals
- Shabazz Palaces – vocals, instrumentation
- Prairie WWWW – vocals, instrumentation
- Xenia Rubinos – vocals
- Jon Anderson – vocals

Studio personnel

- Heba Kadry – mastering
- Nate Odden – engineering
- Brandon Peralta – engineering, mixing assistant
- Chris Tabron – mixing, producer

Artwork

- Andrew Kuo – artwork
- Caleb Halter – design, layout

== Charts ==
Chart (2019)	Peak position
Japanese Albums (Oricon)	112
Scottish Albums (Official Charts)	74
US Independent Albums (Billboard)	23
