= Speaking Canaries =

American indie rock band

The Speaking Canaries (sometimes "Thee Speaking Canaries" or "The(e) Speaking Canaries") are an indie rock group from Pittsburgh, Pennsylvania. They are known for being Don Caballero drummer Damon Che's "other band", and for their unabashed love of the kind of 1970s and '80s hard rock purveyed by bands such as Kiss and Rush—indeed, the Canaries' second album Songs for the Terrestrially Challenged features covers of two Van Halen songs.

== Original lineup (1991-1995) ==
- Damon Che - guitar, vocals
- Karl Hendricks - bass, vocals
- Noah Leger - drums

== Current lineup (2004-present) ==
- Damon Che - guitar, vocals
- Adam Crane - bass
- Eugene Doyle - drums

== Discography ==
- The Joy of Wine (1993) LP on Mind Cure Records
- Songs for the Terrestrially Challenged (hi-fi version) (1995) Double LP / CD on Scat Records
- Songs for the Terrestrially Challenged (low-fi version) (1995) Double LP on Mind Cure Records
- The Opponents (1996) 12" EP on Scat Records
- Life-Like Homes (1998) LP on Scat Records
- Get Out Alive: The Last Type Story (2003) LP / CD on Scat Records
- Get Out Alive: The Long Version (2003) CD-R on Scat Records
