= Storm & Stress (album) =

1997 debut album by Storm & Stress

Studio album by Storm & Stress
- Released: July 8, 1997
- Recorded: Chicago Recording Co, Chicago, Illinois
- Genre: Experimental rock
- Length: 58:55
- Label: Touch and Go

Storm & Stress chronology
Storm & Stress (1997)	Under Thunder and Fluorescent Lights (2000)

Professional ratings
Review scores
Source	Rating
AllMusic	4/5 stars
Entertainment Weekly	B+

Storm & Stress is the debut studio album of Storm & Stress, released on July 8, 1997, through Touch and Go Records.

== Track listing ==
All tracks are written by Storm & Stress, except "Micah Gaugh Sings All Is All" by Micah Gaugh.

No.	Title	Length
1.	"We Write Threnodies. We Write with Explosions"	12:29
2.	"Today Is Totally Crashing & Stunned in Bright Lights"	10:07
3.	"Dance 'til Record Skips Like Passengers Shift on Take Off"	9:23
4.	"Micah Gaugh Sings All Is All"	3:03
5.	"Guitar Cabinet Stack Way High Is Freedom or Gravity Gives Us Rhythm"	11:16
6.	"Piles of Blinkers Slip for New Years"	2:17
7.	"Orange Cone Made No Noise"	10:20
Total length:		58:55

== Personnel ==
Storm & Stress

- Eric Emm – bass guitar
- Kevin Shea – drums, recording on "Micah Gaugh Sings All Is All"
- Ian Williams – vocals, guitar

Production and additional personnel

- Steve Albini – engineering, recording
- Micah Gaugh – vocals and piano on "Micah Gaugh Sings All Is All"
