= Poison arrows (disambiguation) =

Poison arrows are arrows whose heads have been poisoned.

Poison arrows may also refer to:

- Poison Arrows, a 2004 Communiqué album
- "Poison Arrows" (song), a 1984 Mike Oldfield song
- The Poison Arrows, a Chicago, Illinois-based band
