= Under Thunder and Fluorescent Lights =

Studio album by Storm & Stress
- Released: January 18, 2000
- Recorded: June–July 1999
- Studio: Electrical Audio, Chicago, Illinois
- Genre: Experimental rock, math rock
- Length: 43:26
- Label: Touch and Go

Storm & Stress chronology
Storm & Stress (1997)	Under Thunder and Fluorescent Lights (2000)

Professional ratings
Review scores
Source	Rating
AllMusic	4/5 stars
Alternative Press	4/5 stars
NME	7/10 stars
Pitchfork	7.8/10

Under Thunder and Fluorescent Lights is the second and final studio album by Storm & Stress, released on January 18, 2000, through Touch and Go Records.

== Track listing ==
All tracks are written by Storm & Stress.

Under Thunder and Fluorescent Lights track listing
No.	Title	Length
1.	"The Sky's the Ground, the Bombs Are Plants, and We're the Sun, Love"	4:45
2.	"An Address That Was to Skip Ahead of the Gallop of Its Own Sperm and Eggs and Wait for Itself in the Future: Letter to 2096"	4:50
3.	"Meet Me in the Space They Stare at Leaving Their Seat During a Show"	6:11
4.	"It Takes a Million Years to Become Diamonds So Let's Just Burn Like Coal Until the Sky's Black"	5:05
5.	"The 1st. Our Lady of Burning Thorns"	6:14
6.	"O, When My Lady Comes"	1:49
7.	"The 2nd. Perpetuate the Beautiful"	4:08
8.	"And Third and Youngest, Unnamed"	5:13
9.	"Forever, Like Anti-Oxidants (Listen to the Sound Our Cells Make)"	5:11
Total length:		43:26

== Personnel ==
Storm & Stress

- Eric Emm – bass guitar
- Kevin Shea – drums, percussion
- Ian Williams – vocals, guitar

Production and additional personnel

- Jim Black – drums on "Meet Me in the Space They Stare at Leaving Their Seat During a Show"
- Dan Bodwell – bass on "O, When My Lady Comes"
- Micah Gaugh – vocals on "O, When My Lady Comes"
- Jim O'Rourke – engineering, recording
