= B (Battles EP) =

2004 EP by the American math rock band Battles

B EP

EP by Battles
- Released: September 14, 2004
- Genre: Math rock
- Length: 29:28
- Label: Dim Mak Records
- Producer: Battles

Battles chronology
EP C (2004)	B EP (2004)	EP C/B EP (2006)

Professional ratings
Review scores
Source	Rating
AllMusic	2.5/5 stars
Pitchfork	(8.3/10)

B EP is a 2004 EP by the American math rock band Battles. It was part of a trio of EPs released by Battles over the course of three months, and has been called "another sketchbook revealing where the group could end up in the future."

B EP was released on Warp Records.

== Track listing ==
No.	Title	Length
1.	"SZ2"	9:19
2.	"TRAS 3"	1:11
3.	"IPT 2"	1:49
4.	"BTTLS"	12:27
5.	"DANCE"	4:42

== Personnel ==
- Tyondai Braxton – guitar, keyboards
- Dave Konopka – guitar, bass, effects
- John Stanier – drums
- Ian Williams – guitar, keyboards
- Emery Dobyns - Engineer, Mixing
