= Damon Che =

American drummer

- Born: Damon Che Fitzgerald; February 15, 1968 (age 58); Pittsburgh, Pennsylvania
- Origin: Pittsburgh, Pennsylvania
- Genres: Instrumental rock; math rock; indie rock; progressive rock; post-rock
- Occupation: Musician
- Instruments: Drums; percussion; guitar; vocals
- Years active: 1985–present
- Labels: Touch & Go Records; Relapse Records; Joyful Noise Recordings
- Website: Don Caballero's Official Facebook

Damon Che (born Damon Che Fitzgerald, Pittsburgh, Pennsylvania, February 15, 1968) is a rock drummer and guitarist. He has contributed to indie rock and progressive rock through his work with math rock pioneers Don Caballero since 1991. His style is heavily influenced by metal, hard rock, punk, jazz, and fusion.

Che utilizes a hard-hitting yet flowing extrovert style of drumming. In Don Caballero, his drumming takes more of a lead instrument role than just keeping time. There are many instances where the guitars would act as rhythmic foundation, while Che soloed freely on top.

== Early career ==
Che received his first drum kit at the age of fourteen. While in high school, he drummed for the new wave band Syndicate, and then co-founded the synthpop trio Pynknoys (1985–1986), where he sang, played drums, and programmed the drum machine. He then joined Pittsburgh hardcore punk stalwarts Half Life. Che toured the U.S. and played on the group's seven inch EP Under The Knife (released in 1986). Che rounded out the 1980s playing the drums with garage rock band The Heretics and noise rock band Punching Contest.

== With The Speaking Canaries ==
Che formed The Speaking Canaries in 1991, some months before he formed Don Caballero. Unlike all his previous bands in which he was the drummer, Damon Che sings and plays guitar with the Canaries. Songs for the Terrestrially Challenged is the first Speaking Canaries album to be released on compact disc, and the first to see worldwide distribution; therefore, it has often been erroneously attributed as The(e) Speaking Canaries' debut album. On Get Out Alive: The Last Type Story, the most recent of The Speaking Canaries' four albums, Che plays all of the instruments on all but three songs.

== With Don Caballero ==
Che formed Don Caballero in August 1991 with guitarist Mike Banfield and bassist Pat Morris. Che briefly played the drums in Rocco Raca, concurrently with the early months of Don Caballero, until that band dissolved and guitarist Ian Williams joined Don Caballero as a second guitarist in 1992. Between 1993 and 2000, Don Caballero released four highly influential albums, For Respect, Don Caballero 2, What Burns Never Returns and American Don, and one singles collection, Singles Breaking Up (Vol. 1) (all on Touch and Go Records) and played hundreds of shows, earning a reputation as the definitive math rock band.

== With Bellini ==
Several months before the November 2000 breakup of Don Caballero, Damon Che began collaborating with Sicilian guitarist Agostino Tilotta of Uzeda under the moniker "Bellini". This collaboration grew to include singer Giovanna Cacciola and bassist Matthew Taylor, and produced a debut album called Snowing Sun.

In a much publicized incident, Che got into an argument with his bandmates during a show in Athens, Georgia while touring in support of Snowing Sun in October 2002 and proceeded to pack up his gear and drive the band's van to Chicago alone, leaving the others stranded. Che, however, disputes this version of events stating that his departure was agreed upon with the other members of the band. The remaining members of Bellini promptly replaced Che with Girls Against Boys drummer Alexis Fleisig, borrowed a van from the band OXES and managed to complete the tour. Damon Che has not worked with Bellini since.

== With Don Caballero (Reprised) ==
Che reformed Don Caballero in 2003, with himself as the only original member. This revamped lineup completed several tours and in 2006, released an album entitled World Class Listening Problem.

Punkgasm followed in 2008, featuring Che's guitar skills on the title track and his lead vocals on several songs. Currently, Don Caballero is signed to Relapse Records / Touch & Go Records / Joyful Noise Recordings, and released a live album in November 2012 titled Gang Banged With a Headache, and Live. The line-up as of 2013 included Gene Doyle on guitar and Jason Jouver on bass.

== Other work ==
Che briefly played the drums for the Laughing Hyenas in the mid-1990s. Che stayed long enough to record one song with the band, "Shine," which was originally released in 1996 on the Jabberjaw... Pure Sweet Hell compilation and later included on the Third Man Records reissue of Crawl / Hard Times.

Che played bass for Chavez in 1997, filling in for Scott Marshall on a European tour, and later played bass for Creta Bourzia for a U.S. tour in 2001. Che also rejoined Half Life for a pair of reunion shows in Pittsburgh in 2002.

Che has occasionally performed and recorded as a solo artist. On Don Caballero's November 2000 tour, Che opened for the band with a solo set of live drums, looped guitar, samples and vocals. Che also played solo shows sporadically around Pittsburgh in 2001 and 2002. None of this material has been released; Damon's only official solo recording to see the light of day thus far is the "Moby Dick"-esque drum solo "Oh Suzanna" on the 2001 Monitor Records compilation Membranophonics.

In a 2017 appearance on The Trap Set, Che revealed that he has been working as a session drummer in the Pittsburgh area.

Damon Che recorded a new album with El Ten Eleven's Kristian Dunn in 2024 for a new project under the band name Yesness. The debut LP of Yesness is See You At The Solipsist Convention, was released on Joyful Noise Recordings.

== Gear ==
Over the years, Che has consistently played a black Pearl Export drum kit with a Ludwig Power Piccolo snare and a selection of oversized, inexpensive cymbals, often augmented by Rototoms, an auxiliary snare drum and a cowbell. His main snare is memorable for its distinctive "toonk" sound, reminiscent of Alex Van Halen's snare sound. Che would nail his bass drum and pedals to the stage à la Elvin Jones until 2000, when he began using a custom-made plywood board to hold his drum kit in place during live performances. He is also known to set his snare very low to the ground, possibly to accommodate his long arms.

The setup listed below reflects the equipment Che played on World Class Listening Problem and subsequent American tours. Che appears to rent most of his equipment when touring overseas.

- Pearl Export drums in black wrap:
  - 13x6.5" Ludwig Classic Series Power Piccolo snare in Natural Finish
  - 6" Remo Rototom
  - 8" Remo Rototom
  - 10" Remo Rototom
  - 13x11" rack tom
  - 14x12" rack tom
  - 16x16" floor tom
  - 14x5" "auxiliary" snare (possibly a Slingerland Radio King in Blue Sparkle)
  - 22x16" bass drum
- Cymbals:
  - 14" hihats (Zildjian New Beat OR Sabian AA Regular top / Sabian B8 Pro Rock bottom)
  - 20" or 21" B8 Pro ride (used as crash - often a 20" Light Rock Ride)
  - 20" or 21" B8 Pro ride (used as crash - often a 20" Medium Ride)
  - 20" or 21" B8 Pro ride (usually a 20" Power Rock Ride)
- Hardware:
  - Pearl and Ludwig stands
  - Tama Iron Cobra double bass drum pedal with Rhythm Tech vinyl beaters
- Heads:
  - Remo coated Emperor on snare batter (tuned medium-high to very high)
  - Emperor Snare Side on snare bottom (tuned very high)
  - Coated Emperors on tops of toms (tuned medium low)
  - A small "ding a long" (tuned low)
  - Clear Ambassadors on bottoms of toms (tuned high)
  - Coated Emperor on bass drum batter (tuned medium low)
  - Evans black on bass drum front (tuned high)
  - Pinstripes on Rototoms
- Sticks:
  - Pro-Mark TXDC10W marching sticks (played with butt ends)
