= EPC (EP) =

EP by Battles
- Released: October 2004
- Genre: Math rock
- Label: Dotlinecircle
- Producer: Battles

Battles chronology
| B EP (2004) | EPC (2004) | EP C / B EP (2006) |

EPC was the third EP released by the experimental rock band Battles. It was released by Dotlinecircle in 2004. In Japan, this EP was well received critically and is the only EP by Battles (whose name is rendered on the front cover in katakana, バトルス, Batorusu) to be released in Japan alone.

== Track listing ==
All tracks are written by Battles

| No. | Title | Length |
|---|---|---|
| 1. | "B+T" | 6:10 |
| 2. | "UW" | 3:02 |
| 3. | "Ipt-2" | 1:34 |
| 4. | "Tras 2" | 5:50 |

== Personnel ==
- Battles – artwork, mixing, concept
- Tyondai Braxton – guitar, keyboards
- Emery Dobyns – engineer, mixing
- Jason Fulford – cover photo
- Tom Hutten – mastering
- David Konopka – guitar
- John Stanier – drums
- Ian Williams – guitar, keyboards
