= EP C =

EP by Battles
- Released: June 8, 2004
- Genre: Math rock
- Length: 24:25
- Label: Monitor

Battles chronology
EP C (2004)	B EP (2004)

EP C is the first EP album release from the American math rock band Battles. It was released on Monitor Records.

== Track listing ==
No.	Title	Length
1.	"B+T"	6:09
2.	"UW"	3:00
3.	"HI/LO"	7:51
4.	"IPT-2"	1:35
5.	"TRAS 2"	5:50

== Personnel ==
- Tyondai Braxton – guitar, keyboards
- Dave Konopka – guitar, bass, effects
- John Stanier – drums
- Ian Williams – guitar, keyboards
- Emery Dobyns - Engineer, Mixing
