= Get Out Alive: The Last Type Story =

Studio album by Speaking Canaries
- Released: 2003
- Genre: Indie rock
- Length: 39:11
- Label: Scat Records SCAT 57
- Producer: Speaking Canaries

Speaking Canaries chronology
| Life Like Homes (1998) | Get Out Alive: The Last Type Story (2003) |

Professional ratings
Review scores
| Source | Rating |
|---|---|
| AllMusic | 4/5 stars |
| Uncut | 1.5/5 stars |

Get Out Alive: The Last Type Story is the fourth album from The Speaking Canaries, a Pittsburgh-based indie rock band.

== Critical reception ==
Reviewing the long version, Tiny Mix Tapes wrote that [Damon] Che's "guitar playing [is] the protagonist in this particular tale, employing everything from chaotic six-string torture, to hacking and jittery math-rock, and all the way to pinch harmonics and back again, almost to the point of note-per-minute showoffery." Rolling Stone praised the "napalm riffing and glass-spear harmonics that tell you exactly what Husker Du would have sounded like with Eddie Van Halen and J Mascis on four-handed guitar."

== Track listing ==
1. "I Wear Glasses in the Most Brutal Sport Ever Invented" - 2:55
2. "Menopause Diaries" - 4:47
3. "Last Type" - 4:29
4. "Coffin Jitters" - 3:29
5. "Last Side of Town part 2" - 6:04
6. "Life Like Homes" - 8:23
7. "Song on a Record You Can't Get" - 4:52
8. "Theme from Hospital Comedian" - 4:08

== Personnel ==
- The Speaking Canaries:
  - Damon Che - Guitars, vocals, drums, bass, percussion, glockenspiel, recording engineer
  - Noah Leger - drums on half (lower in the mix will be a sure indication. Liner notes are incorrect).
  - Jon Purse - Bass on two songs
  - Ingrid - vocals on "Life Like Homes"
- Al Sutton - Recording engineer, mixing engineer
- Robert Ebeling - Mixing engineer
- Todd Doehering - Recording engineer, mixing engineer

== Get Out Alive: The Long Version ==
An alternate, longer version (76:02) of Get Out Alive was released by Scat Records on CD-R at the same time as the regular version. Get Out Alive: The Long Version features extended versions of "Last Side of Town", "Last Type" and "Coffin Jitters" and adds the song "Stuffed With Fear".
