= Guy Caballero =

Fictional character from SCTV

- Second City Television character
- Caballero on the cover of an SCTV DVD, with Edith Prickley.
- Portrayed by: Joe Flaherty

In-universe information
- Gender: Male
- Occupation: Television station president and owner

Guy Caballero is a fictional character on the television series SCTV played by Joe Flaherty. President and owner of the fictional SCTV network, Caballero usually appeared on the series to introduce various network programs, although he also occasionally got wrapped up in behind-the-scenes storylines.

== Character ==
Cheap, dishonest, gruff, and prone to making meandering patriotic speeches for no good reason, Caballero liked to affectionately describe his employees as "the SCTV family," although he routinely treated them with disdain. He was always seen in a white suit and white Panama hat, but his most notable quirk was his use of a wheelchair despite not needing one; he believed that the wheelchair helped earn people's "respect."

Though Caballero's personal past was left deliberately shady, it was mentioned several times that he was an illegal alien (from South America) who had managed to buy his way into the United States "when he showed up in Panama with suitcases full of Nazi gold." Caballero has a huge mansion named "Casa del Forgeo" that he paid for by forging checks, but he is too cheap to pay for a phone inside the house—instead, he had his mansion built near a payphone.

Guy's wife Googie was infrequently mentioned and never seen. He also had two sons named Ricky and Sonny (played by Rick Moranis and Eugene Levy) and a daughter Connie (played by Andrea Martin). Guy at one point had an affair with SCTV star Lola Heatherton, but broke it off, later explaining (using network ratings terms) "it was doing poorly in the overnights".

Guy Caballero was originally a character heard only over the phone in two first-season SCTV episodes aired in 1977 (both times, he called Moe Green while on the air to complain about Moe's show Dialing for Dollars). The character made his first physical appearance in the SCTV second season opener, aired in September 1978, and was thereafter a regularly appearing fixture of the show. As the owner and president of SCTV, Guy frequently appeared on the network to introduce shows, to make announcements, or to apologize for previous programming blunders. Behind the scenes, Guy was ever on the lookout for cheap, popular programming, and he had no qualms about running shows that pandered to the audience, or were low-quality knockoffs of other, more popular TV series. Sticking to a low, low budget was also a priority, as writer/director/star Johnny LaRue found out after he used an expensive crane shot in his production of Polynesiantown—Caballero cancelled all of LaRue's SCTV projects, and further punished him by forcing him to do a solo late-night program called Street Beef which used exactly one camera and one microphone.

It is rumored that Flaherty based the mannerisms and appearance of the Cabellero character on Laurence Olivier's portrayal of Loren Hardman in the movie The Betsy, released earlier in 1978. Adapted from the Harold Robbins book of the same name, the movie portrays Loren Hardman as the gruff business patriarch of an automobile empire. Like Caballero, Hardman wears a white suit and white Panama hat, and rides in a wheelchair even though he can walk.

Don Caballero was named after Guy Caballero and their debut album For Respect pays tribute to the character and SCTV throughout the album.

Flaherty reprised the role of Caballero in 1988 as an in-studio host for a free weekend preview of Cinemax (where SCTV had aired its final season in 1983–84). He had similarly reprised his role of Count Floyd for a 1987 free preview. In 2003, he hosted a Rogers On Demand infomercial as Caballero.

== Notable SCTV storylines ==
- Caballero and actor DeForest Kelley (the latter played by Dave Thomas) team up to prevent aliens from taking over the network and the world.
- Caballero develops a long-running feud with star Johnny LaRue as a result of LaRue's TV movie Polynesiantown running significantly over budget. Caballero forces LaRue to take the demeaning job of hosting the cheap show Street Beef.
- Caballero is briefly fired by the network's board of directors after involving Fred Willard (played by himself) in a scam that involves pocketing money meant for the station.
- Caballero develops a feud with the presidents of ABC, CBS, and NBC, resulting in a gangland-style war which parodies The Godfather.
- In the episode of SCTV that parodies the disaster film The Towering Inferno, Caballero brushes off concerns about his supposed invalid status by standing up and announcing, "I have strong legs!" He then proceeds to trip and fall down the stairwell of the burning building (the camera occasionally cutting away to show his progress until he finally reaches the ground floor).
