= Yesness =

American instrumental rock group

- Origin: Pittsburgh, Pennsylvania & San Diego, California
- Genres: post-rock; post-progressive; post-hardcore
- Instruments: Drums & Bass
- Years active: 2023-present
- Label: Joyful Noise Recordings
- Members: Damon Che; Kristian Dunn

Yesness is an American post-rock band composed of Damon Che (drummer of seminal math rock band Don Caballero) and Kristian Dunn (bassist of El Ten Eleven). Che is known for his pioneering drumming style and Dunn for his expertise in the experimental use of the eight-stringed bass.

== History ==
Yesness released their debut LP, See You at the Solipsist Convention, in November 2024. The album's single "Not So Sorry Now Are You?", debuted on Stereogum. Also released that month, was a single with chamber-pop savant Kishi Bashi, described as "a string-studded panorama volleying between nervy hyperactivity and heartfelt grandeur."

The Needle Drop summarizes the group's formation with the following anecdote:

See You at the Solipsist Convention was born out of nearly one year of remote collaboration, where Dunn and Che shared their musical ideas between emails and texts. The pair was initially introduced through the label’s founder and curator, Karl Hofstetter, who helped piece together Yesness despite having never previously collaborated. He found instant chemistry in the pair, despite their physical distance; Dunn and Che only met in the same recording space after eight months of remote communication.

The group prepared to embark on a U.S. tour, shortly after their record's street date.
