= Punkgasm =

Studio album by Don Caballero
- Released: August 19, 2008
- Recorded: April–June 2008
- Studio: Rust Belt Studios (Royal Oak, Michigan)
- Genre: Math rock
- Length: 48:59
- Label: Relapse

Don Caballero chronology
World Class Listening Problem (2006)	Punkgasm (2008)	Gang Banged with a Headache, and Live (2012)

Professional ratings
Review scores
Source	Rating
AbsolutePunk	65% link
AllMusic	3/5 stars
Pitchfork Media	4.8/10

Punkgasm is the sixth and final studio album by American math rock band Don Caballero. It was released in 2008. It is the only album by the band to feature vocals.

== Track listing ==
No.	Title	Length
1.	"Loudest Shop Vac in the World"	8:56
2.	"The Irrespective Dick Area"	1:31
3.	"Bulk Eye"	4:57
4.	"Shit Kids Galore"	1:03
5.	"Celestial Dusty Groove"	2:34
6.	"Pour You into the Rug"	3:23
7.	"Challenge Jets"	2:37
8.	"Lord Krepelka"	4:23
9.	"Why Is the Couch Always Wet?"	3:28
10.	"Slaughbaugh's Ought Not Own Dog Data"	4:43
11.	"Dirty Looks"	1:44
12.	"Who's a Puppy Cat"	1:42
13.	"Awe Man That's Jive Skip"	4:01
14.	"Punkgasm"	3:51

== Personnel ==
Don Caballero

- Damon Che – drums (tracks 1–11, 13); vocals (tracks 6, 11, 14); synthesizer (track 12); guitar (track 14)
- Eugene Doyle – guitar (tracks 1–3, 5–13); vocals (track 5); drums (track 14)
- Jason Jouver – bass guitar (tracks 1, 5–11, 14); guitar (tracks 2, 3, 13); vocals (tracks 5, 9); engineer (14)

Technical

- Al Sutton – engineer (tracks 1–13); mixing
- Sean Cho – engineer (track 14)
- Allen Douches – mastering
- Matt Dayak – photography, artwork
