= Battles (band) =

American rock band

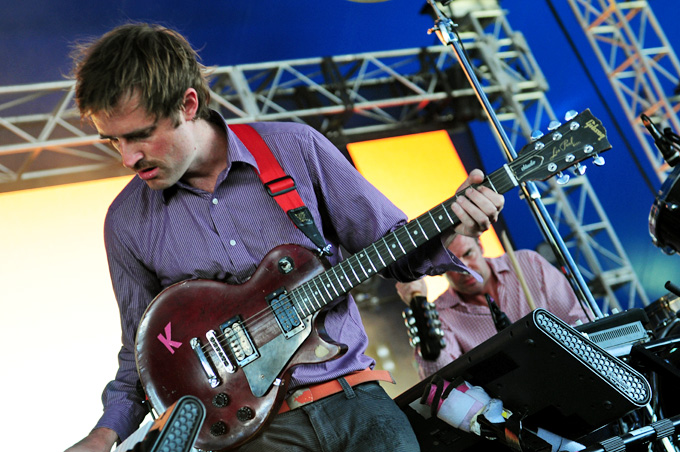
- Battles performing live in McCallum Park in 2012. From left to right: Williams, Stanier

Background information
- Origin: New York City, United States
- Genres: Experimental rock; math rock; electronic
- Years active: 2002–present
- Labels: Dim Mak; Warp
- Members: Ian Williams; John Stanier
- Past members: Tyondai Braxton; Dave Konopka
- Website: www.bttls.com

Battles is an American experimental rock duo formed in 2002 in New York City by Ian Williams (formerly of Don Caballero and Storm & Stress). The current line-up is composed of guitarist/keyboardist Williams and drummer John Stanier (Tomahawk, formerly of Helmet and The Mark of Cain). Former members include composer/vocalist Tyondai Braxton and guitarist/bassist Dave Konopka. The band has released four studio albums to date, with the most recent Juice B Crypts being released in 2019.

The band is highly regarded by critics, particularly for their work from the mid-2000s to the 2010s, as well as integrating avant-garde and experimental electronic influences. In 2007, Pitchfork wrote that "Battles have done more to extend the idea of a flesh-and-blood band enhanced by computer technology than anyone since the late, lamented Disco Inferno."

== Career ==
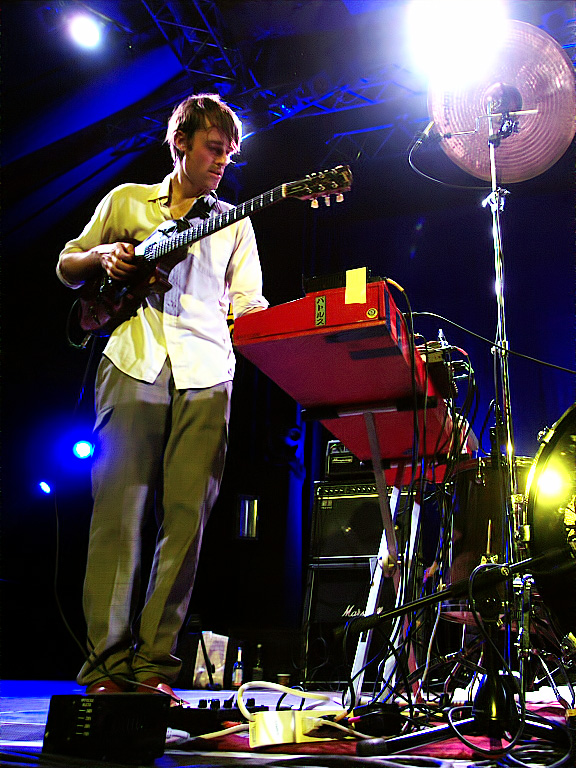
Ian Williams at the 2008 Moers Festival.

Battles released two EPs, EP C, B EP, and the single "Tras" before signing to Warp Records. Warp compiled these early recordings and released them as an album, titled EP C / B EP, in February 2006.

Their first studio album, Mirrored, was recorded by Keith Souza at Machines with Magnets, and released on May 14, 2007, preceded by a single, "Atlas". The single was the NME's Single of the Week, and went on to reach number one in the Dandelion Radio Festive Fifty. The album received positive reviews and appeared on several top album lists for 2007. The group would go on to play at 2007's All Tomorrow's Parties festival and later at BBC television's Later With Jools Holland. Before the end of the year they collaborated with United Visual Artists in a video for track "Tonto". Battles' music was used in video games such as LittleBigPlanet, short films, television programs, and on the soundtracks of films Twilight Saga: Eclipse and Big Fan in the following years.

Braxton left the group in August 2010, indicating that he did not wish to tour, although Battles already had a touring schedule lined up for the upcoming year. Speaking about the split in 2013 to The Brag, Braxton pointed to a "long standing divide" between himself and his bandmates.

Battles' second album, Gloss Drop, was released on June 6, 2011, featuring guests including Matias Aguayo, Gary Numan, Kazu Makino, and Yamantaka Eye. The band announced a spring tour in support of the record. In December 2011, the band curated the All Tomorrow's Parties "Nightmare Before Christmas" festival in Minehead, England alongside co-curators Les Savy Fav and Caribou. From February to April 2012, a series of four 12" vinyl EPs were released, titled Dross Glop (a spoonerism of the album's title) 1 through 4, featuring dance remixes of all the songs on Gloss Drop by various artists, including Gui Boratto, Kode9 and Hudson Mohawke. A compilation album featuring the 11 remixes (plus one not included, "Sundome") was released on April 16, 2012.

In 2014, their third album, La Di Da Di, was released on September 18, 2015. This was preceded by a live session through Warp Records of them performing four new songs in New York City. The stream was up for 24 hours only, and was set on a constant loop.

Konopka left the band in 2018, although the news was not confirmed until May 2019. The band played their first show as a duo in July 2019, at the Dour Festival in Belgium. Their fourth album, Juice B Crypts, was released on October 18, 2019. It features collaborations with Shabazz Palaces, Liquid Liquid's Sal Principato, Xenia Rubinos, Jon Anderson of Yes and Tune-Yards' Merrill Garbus.

In December 2021, it was announced the band would tour North America in April and May 2022 as the opening act on Primus' A Tribute to Kings tour. In September 2023, the band was the opening act for Mr. Bungle's seven-date North American tour.

In April 2026 Williams shared a new song, "Doctor Octopus" on East Village Radio; Stanier subsequently confirmed a new Battles album would be released in the near future.

== Members ==
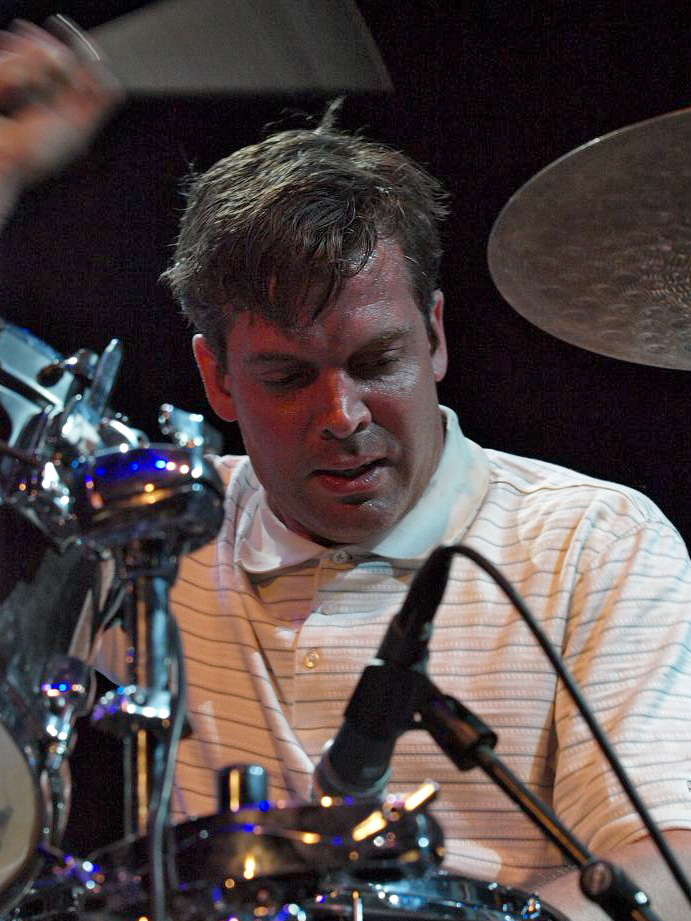
John Stanier, 2008 Moers Festival.

Current members

- Ian Williams – guitar, keyboards, sequencer (2002–present); effects, bass guitar, loops (2018–present)
- John Stanier – drums, percussion (2002–present)

Former members

- Tyondai Braxton – guitar, keyboards, vocals (2002–2010)
- Dave Konopka – bass guitar, guitar, effects, loops (2002–2018)

== Discography ==
=== Studio albums ===
List of studio albums, with selected chart positions
Title	Album details	Peak chart positions									
Title	Album details	US	AUS Hit.	BEL (FL)	BEL (WA)	IRL	ITA	JPN	NLD	SCO	UK
Mirrored	Released: May 14, 2007; Label: Warp Records	— (Note: Mirrored did not enter the US Billboard 200, but peaked at number seven on the US Heatseekers Albums Chart.)	—	67	—	35	91	44	—	79	70
Gloss Drop	Released: June 6, 2011; Label: Warp Records	98	6	73	—	50	—	30	—	49	48
La Di Da Di	Released: September 18, 2015; Label: Warp Records	— (Note: La Di Da Di did not enter the US Billboard 200, but peaked at number 13 on the US Vinyl Albums Chart.)	7	86	101	97	—	49	97	68	57
Juice B Crypts	Released: October 18, 2019; Label: Warp Records	— (Note: Juice B Crypts did not enter the US Billboard 200, but peaked at number 81 on the US Top Current Albums Chart.)	—	—	—	—	—	112	—	74	— (Note: Juice B Crypts did not enter the UK Albums Chart, but peaked at number 48 on the UK Album Sales Chart.)
"—" denotes a recording that did not chart or was not released in that territory.

=== EPs ===
- EP C (Monitor Records, June 8, 2004)
- B EP (Dim Mak Records, September 14, 2004)
- EPC (Dotlinecircle, October 2004) – Japan only special mix edition
- Lives (Beat Records, September 27, 2007)
- Tonto+ (Warp Records, October 22, 2007)
- Dross Glop 1 (Warp Records, February 6, 2012)
- Dross Glop 2 (Warp Records, February 20, 2012)
- Dross Glop 3 (Warp Records, March 19, 2012)
- Dross Glop 4 (Warp Records, April 21, 2012) – Released on Record Store Day
- Juice B Mixed (Warp Records, November 20, 2020)

=== Compilations ===
- EP C/B EP (Warp Records, February 21, 2006)
- Dross Glop (Warp Records, April 16, 2012) — CD compilation of the four-part 12" vinyl remixes

=== Singles ===
List of singles, with selected chart positions, showing year released and album
Title	Year	Peak chart positions						Album
Title	Year	US Sales	US Dance	MEX	UK Sales	UK Indie	UK Rock	Album
"Tras"	2004	—	—	—	—	—	—	Non-album single
"Atlas"	2007	26	8	—	87	13	3	Mirrored
"Tonto"	2007	7	1	—	—	—	—	Mirrored
"The Line"	2010	—	—	—	—	—	—	The Twilight Saga: Eclipse (soundtrack)
"Ice Cream" (featuring Matias Aguayo)	2011	14	4	28	5	— (Note: "Ice Cream" did not enter the UK Independent Singles Chart, but peaked at number 18 on the UK Independent Singles Breakers Chart.)	—	Gloss Drop
"My Machines" (featuring Gary Numan)	2011	—	9	32	26	—	—	Gloss Drop
"The Yabba"	2015	—	—	—	—	—	—	La Di Da Di
"FF Bada"	2015	—	—	—	—	—	—	La Di Da Di
"Titanium 2 Step"	2019	—	—	—	—	—	—	Juice B Crypts
"Stirling Bridge"	2020	—	—	—	55	—	—	Juice B Mixed
"—" denotes a recording that did not chart or was not released in that territory.

=== Music videos ===
- "Atlas" (2007)
- "Tonto" (2007)
- "Ice Cream" (2011)
- "My Machines" (2011)
- "The Yabba" (2015)
- "Dot Net" (2015)
- "Titanium 2 Step" (2019)
- "Fort Greene Park" (2019)
- "Sugar Foot" (2020)

== Filmography ==
- All Tomorrow's Parties (October 2009)
- Battles: The Art of Repetition (July 2015)
