= Singles Breaking Up (Vol. 1) =

Compilation album by Don Caballero
- Released: January 12, 1999
- Recorded: 1992–1997
- Studio: Electrical Audio (Chicago, Illinois), Sound Seven Studios (Valencia, Pennsylvania)
- Genre: Math rock; post-hardcore; instrumental rock
- Length: 46:31
- Label: Touch and Go
- Producer: Lee Hollihan; Steve Albini; Bob Weston; Al Sutton

Don Caballero chronology
What Burns Never Returns (1998)	Singles Breaking Up (Vol. 1) (1999)	American Don (2000)

Singles Breaking Up (Vol. 1) is a compilation album by American math rock band Don Caballero. Singles Breaking Up (Vol. 1) was released on Touch and Go Records in 1999 and collects songs from five of the band's seven-inch singles, one song from a "various artists" compilation and one previously unreleased song.

== Background ==
The title is a reference to The Buzzcocks' compilation album Singles Going Steady.

The collection would later be issued on vinyl for the first time on October 20, 2017. Despite what the name suggests, there is no Singles Breaking Up (Vol. 2).

== Track listing ==
No.	Title	Length
1.	"Lucky Father Brown"	3:13
2.	"Belted Sweater"	2:02
3.	"Shoe Shine"	5:30
4.	"Unresolved Kharma"	4:40
5.	"Puddin' In My Eye"	4:15
6.	"My Ten Year Old Lady Is Giving It Away"	5:48
7.	"Our Caballero"	2:08
8.	"ANDANDANDANDANDANDANDANDANDAND"	2:15
9.	"First Hits"	3:23
10.	"No More Peace and Quiet for the Warlike"	4:35
11.	"If You've Read Dr. Adder Then You Know What I Want"	1:00
12.	"Trey Dog's Acid"	3:50
13.	"Room Temperature Lounge"	5:00

== Reception ==
Professional ratings
Review scores
Source	Rating
Allmusic	4/5 stars
Chronicles of Chaos	8/10 stars
Pitchfork Media	7.2/10

Pitchfork gave the album a 7.2 out of 10.

== Personnel ==
Band members are not named on the packaging and the album is credited simply to 'Don Caballero.'

Don Caballero

- Damon Che – drums
- Mike Banfield – guitar (tracks 1–10, 12–13)
- Pat Morris – bass guitar (tracks 1–9, 12–13)
- Ian Williams – guitar (tracks 7–13)
- George Draguns – bass guitar (track 10)
- Matt Jencik – bass guitar (track 11)

=== Technical ===
- Lee Hollihan – engineer (tracks 1–6)
- Steve Albini – engineer, producer (tracks 7–9, 12–13) (uncredited)
- Bob Weston – engineer (track 10)
- Al Sutton – producer (song 11)
