= Mirrored =

Studio album by Battles
- Released: May 14, 2007
- Recorded: 2006
- Studios: Machines with Magnets, Pawtucket, RI
- Genres: Math rock; experimental rock; progressive rock; post-rock; avant-prog
- Length: 51:52
- Label: Warp
- Producer: Battles

Battles chronology
EP C/B EP (2006)	Mirrored (2007)	Tonto+ (2007)

Singles from Mirrored
- 1. "Atlas" Released: 2007; 2. "Tonto" Released: 2007

Mirrored is the debut studio album by American experimental rock band Battles. It was released on May 14, 2007 in the United Kingdom, and on May 22, 2007 in the United States. Mirrored marked the first album in which the band incorporated prominent vocals and lyrics into their songs, as previous extended plays by the band had been completely instrumental, with the exception of occasional beatboxing and wordless vocals on certain tracks. The first single from the album, "Atlas", was released in the United Kingdom on April 2, 2007. Mirrored was released to wide critical acclaim and appeared on year-end best album lists from several publications, including Time, NME, The Guardian, and Pitchfork.

== Reception ==
Professional ratings
Aggregate scores
Source	Rating
Metacritic	86/100
Review scores
Source	Rating
AllMusic	4.5/5 stars
The A.V. Club	B
Blender	4/5 stars
The Guardian	5/5 stars
MSN Music (Consumer Guide)	B−
NME	8/10
Pitchfork	9.1/10
Rolling Stone	3.5/5 stars
Spin	4/5 stars
Uncut	4/5 stars

Mirrored was widely acclaimed upon release. At Metacritic, which assigns a normalized rating out of 100 to reviews from mainstream critics, the album received an average score of 86, indicating "universal acclaim", based on 31 reviews. The album placed ninth in The Wire's annual critics' poll. Online music magazine Pitchfork later placed Mirrored at number 105 on their list of top 200 albums of the 2000s. The single "Atlas" was ranked at number 42 on Pitchfork's top 500 tracks of the 2000s list. In October 2011, NME placed "Atlas" at number 54 on its list "150 Best Tracks of the Past 15 Years".

== Track listing ==
All tracks are written by Battles.

No.	Title	Length
1.	"Race : In"	4:50
2.	"Atlas"	7:07
3.	"Ddiamondd"	2:33
4.	"Tonto"	7:43
5.	"Leyendecker"	2:48
6.	"Rainbow"	8:11
7.	"Bad Trails"	5:18
8.	"Prismism"	0:52
9.	"Snare Hangar"	1:58
10.	"Tij"	7:03
11.	"Race : Out"	3:29

Japan bonus track
No.	Title	Length
12.	"Katoman"	2:08

== Personnel ==
Battles

- John Stanier – drums
- Dave Konopka – guitar, bass, effects
- Tyondai Braxton – guitar, keyboards, vocals
- Ian Williams – guitar, keyboards

Additional personnel

- Keith Souza – recording engineer, mixing
- Mike Viele – assistant engineering
- Seth Manchester – assistant engineering
- Jeff Lipton – mastering
- Jessica Thompson – mastering
- Dave Konopka – art direction and design
- Timothy Saccenti – photography
