= Songs for the Terrestrially Challenged =

Songs For The Terrestrially Challenged

Studio album by Speaking Canaries
- Released: 1995
- Recorded: August 2–6, 1993
- Genre: Indie rock
- Length: 74:50
- Label: Scat Records SCAT 39

Speaking Canaries chronology
The Joy of Wine (1992)	Songs For The Terrestrially Challenged (1995)	The Opponents (1996)

Professional ratings
Review scores
Source	Rating
AllMusic	3/5 stars

Songs For The Terrestrially Challenged is an album by Pittsburgh's The(e) Speaking Canaries, released in 1995. It is the first Speaking Canaries album to be released on compact disc, and the first to see worldwide distribution; therefore, it has often been erroneously attributed as The(e) Speaking Canaries' debut album. (The Joy of Wine, the band's actual debut, was a vinyl-only release on a small label and was limited to five hundred copies.) Songs For The Terrestrially Challenged is notable for its long songs, its long total running time, and its multiple album versions.

Songs For The Terrestrially Challenged includes two Van Halen covers: "Girl Gone Bad" and "Secrets". ("Summer's Empty Resolution", a harmonics-drenched solo for acoustic guitar, is vaguely reminiscent of Eddie Van Halen's "Spanish Fly".)

== Critical reception ==
The Chicago Reader called the album one of 1995's "most passionate records," writing that "the Canaries don't play at being a rock band; they're the real thing. They throw themselves into their music with complete ferocity, whipping up an aural maelstrom on their new album that's comparable with the Who's legendary Live at Leeds." Trouser Press wrote that the album "boasts some emphatically mesmerizing moments: [Damon] Che unskeins some of the more fetching controlled feedback explorations you’re likely to hear, especially 'Summer’s Empty Resolution' and the Middle Eastern-tinged 'Famous No Space'." The Chicago Tribune called it "a slew of great tunes delivered with white-hot, Stooges-style intensity." CMJ New Music Monthly wrote: "The depth and breath of this record is remarkable; listening can be work, and each time reveals new aural tricks."

== Track listing ==
1. "Houses and Houses of Perfectness" – 4:52
2. "Summer's Empty Resolution" – 1:37
3. "Terrestrial / Famous No Space" – 8:10
4. "Guitar Strings for a Holocaust" – 3:53
5. "Hall Of Force / Gone Bad / So Glad / Reprise" – 9:20
6. ""Little" Ice Queen" – 6:35
7. "Super Hit" – 2:38
8. "El Rancho" – 6:08
9. "Any Three Days" – 12:57
10. "Secrets" – 2:55
11. "Our War On Cool Pt. 2" – 3:59
12. "When Cats Fight / Let Loose of Me" – 4:55
13. "De-Effect / Diminished" – 6:40

== Personnel ==
- The(e) Speaking Canaries:
  - Damon Che - Guitar, vocals
  - Karl Hendricks - Bass
  - Noah Leger - drums
- Al Sutton - Recording engineer

== "Low-fi version" ==
An alternate, lower-fidelity recording of Songs For The Terrestrially Challenged was released by Mind Cure Records in 1995, roughly concurrent with the release of the "hi-fi version" on Scat Records. The "low-fi version" is available only as a double LP in a limited, numbered edition of five hundred copies with the first 100 on yellow vinyl. Each copy has liner notes handwritten by Dave Martin of Mind Cure Records and 3x5" photographic prints glued inside the gatefold record sleeve.
