= La Di Da Di (album) =

Studio album by Battles
- Released: September 18, 2015
- Recorded: 2014
- Studios: Machines with Magnets, Pawtucket, Rhode Island
- Genres: Experimental rock; math rock; instrumental rock
- Length: 49:13
- Label: Warp
- Producers: Battles; Keith Souza; Seth Manchester

Battles chronology
Dross Glop (2012)	La Di Da Di (2015)	Juice B Crypts (2019)

Singles from La Di Da Di
- 1. "The Yabba" Released: August 13, 2015; 2. "FF Bada" Released: September 2, 2015

La Di Da Di is the third studio album by American experimental rock band Battles, released on September 18, 2015 on Warp Records. It is the band's last album with guitarist/bassist Dave Konopka before his departure in 2018.

== Recording ==
La Di Da Di is Battles' only album without vocals. Guitarist Dave Konopka said: "To me, vocals are like this fourth instrument that is totally insignificant in a band like Battles because we kind of have nothing to say and out of the three of us none of us are capable of really singing. The decision to not have vocals is more of a self-sufficient, functional decision than anything. I love plenty of bands with vocals, don’t get me wrong. When it applies to us and the chemical makeup of Battles it’s just inexplicable."

== Critical reception ==
Professional ratings
Aggregate scores
Source	Rating
AnyDecentMusic?	6.8/10
Metacritic	73/100
Review scores
Source	Rating
AllMusic	4/5 stars
Consequence of Sound	B−
NME	6/10
Pitchfork	7.5/10
Spin	7/10

La Di Da Di received mostly positive reviews from contemporary music critics. At Metacritic, which assigns a normalized rating out of 100 to reviews from mainstream critics, the album received an average score of 73, based on 30 reviews, which indicates "generally favorable reviews".

== Track listing ==
All tracks are written by Battles.

No.	Title	Length
1.	"The Yabba"	6:49
2.	"Dot Net"	2:59
3.	"FF Bada"	4:25
4.	"Summer Simmer"	5:49
5.	"Cacio e Pepe"	2:41
6.	"Non-Violence"	3:44
7.	"Dot Com"	4:19
8.	"Tyne Wear"	1:50
9.	"Tricentennial"	2:56
10.	"Megatouch"	5:23
11.	"Flora > Fauna"	1:26
12.	"Luu Le"	6:52
Total length:		49:13

Japanese edition bonus track
No.	Title	Length
13.	"FFA Reprise"	2:05
Total length:		51:18

== Personnel ==
Battles

- Dave Konopka – bass, guitar, effects
- John Stanier – drums
- Ian Williams – guitar, keyboards

Production

- Battles – producer
- Keith Souza – producer, mixer
- Seth Manchester – producer, mixer
- Greg Calbi – mastering
- Dave Konopka – art direction
- Warp Music – publisher

== Charts ==
Chart (2015)	Peak position
Belgian Albums (Ultratop Flanders)	86
Belgian Albums (Ultratop Wallonia)	101
Dutch Albums (Album Top 100)	97
Irish Albums (IRMA)	97
UK Albums (Official Charts)	57
