= EP C/B EP =

Compilation album by Battles
- Released: February 6, 2006
- Recorded: 2004
- Genre: Math rock; experimental rock
- Length: 66:08
- Label: Warp Records
- Producer: Battles

Battles chronology
B EP (2004)	EP C/B EP (2006)	Mirrored (2007)

Professional ratings
Review scores
Source	Rating
Drowned in Sound	7/10 stars
Pitchfork Media	8.0
Tiny Mix Tapes	4.5/5 stars
Onda Rock	6.5/10 stars
Goute mes Disques	9/10 stars

EP C/B EP is a two disc compilation by the American math rock band Battles. It brings together the two previous EPs, EP C, B EP and the "Tras" single. It was released in 2006 on Warp Records.

EP C was originally released on June 8, 2004 with Monitor Records, and B EP on September 14, 2004 with Dim Mak Records.

== Track listing ==
All tracks are written by Battles.

Disc two: EP C
No.	Title	Length
1.	"B+T"	6:09
2.	"UW"	3:01
3.	"HI/LO"	7:51
4.	"IPT-2"	1:34
5.	"TRAS 2"	5:50
6.	"FANTASY"	9:09

Disc one: B EP
No.	Title	Length
1.	"SZ2"	9:19
2.	"TRAS 3"	1:11
3.	"IPT 2"	1:49
4.	"BTTLS"	12:27
5.	"DANCE"	4:43
6.	"TRAS"	3:38

The final track, "FANTASY", is divided into 10 tracks on the CD version. The first of these is 8:31, this is followed by 8 tracks of 4 second bass kicks. The final track (a quieter bass kick) is 6 seconds. Track lengths shown as they appear on the CD jacket. The actual lengths differ by seconds.

== Personnel ==
- Tyondai Braxton – guitar, keyboards
- Dave Konopka – guitar, bass, effects
- John Stanier – drums
- Ian Williams – guitar, keyboards
