= Don Caballero 2 =

Studio album by Don Caballero
- Released: September 19, 1995
- Recorded: January 1995
- Studio: White Room Studios (Detroit, Michigan)
- Genres: Math rock; noise rock; drone; post-hardcore
- Length: 58:57
- Label: Touch and Go
- Producer: Al Sutton

Don Caballero chronology
For Respect (1993)	Don Caballero 2 (1995)	What Burns Never Returns (1998)

Professional ratings
Review scores
Source	Rating
AllMusic	4.5/5 stars
Chronicles of Chaos	7/10

Don Caballero 2 is the second studio album by American math rock band Don Caballero. It was released in 1995 on Touch and Go Records. The album is the group's longest, clocking in at almost one hour in length.

== Critical reception ==
Ira Robbins, in Trouser Press, wrote that "Don Caballero hasn’t completely sacrificed its softer side to the gods of skronk, and the meditative 'Cold Knees (in April)' suggests the sound of several thumb pianos, arranged by Philip Glass and fingered by Einstürzende Neubauten."

== Track listing ==
No.	Title	Length
1.	"Stupid Puma"	4:21
2.	"Please tokio, please THIS IS TOKIO"	11:18
3.	"P, P, P, Antless"	3:44
4.	"Repeat Defender"	11:00
5.	"Dick Suffers Is Furious with You"	9:11
6.	"Cold Knees (in April)"	4:14
7.	"Rollerblade Success Story"	4:30
8.	"No One Gives a Hoot About FAUX-ASS Nonsense"	10:44
Total length:		58:58

The album suffers consistently from a misreading of the track listing on internet sources whereby "Dick Suffers Is Furious with You" and "Cold Knees (in April)" are switched in the order with "P, P, P, Antless" and "Repeat Defender." However, on careful examination of the CD booklet, the track listing is divided into 4 sections (I. "Stupid Puma" & "please tokio, please THIS IS TOKIO", II. "P, P, P, Antless" & "Repeat Defender", III. "Dick Suffers Is Furious with You" & "Cold Knees (in April)", IV. "Rollerblade Success Story" & "No One Gives a Hoot About FAUX-ASS Nonsense"). The track listing on Touch & Go's website compounds the confusion by offering the song "Cold Knees (in April)" for listening but naming it as "Repeat Defender".

== Personnel ==
=== Don Caballero ===
- Damon Che – drums, sound effects
- Ian Williams – guitar
- Mike Banfield – guitar
- Matt Jencik – bass guitar

=== Additional musicians ===
- George Draguns – bass guitar
- David Reid – bass guitar

=== Technical ===
- Al Sutton – production
- Andy Vogt – photography, artwork
