= Storm & Stress =

American band

- Origin: Pittsburgh and Chicago
- Genres: Experimental rock; math rock
- Years active: 1994–2000
- Label: Touch and Go Records
- Past members: Ian Williams; Eric Emm; Kevin Shea; George Draguns

Storm & Stress were an American experimental rock band formed in Pittsburgh by bassist George Draguns, drummer Kevin Shea and vocalist/guitarist Ian Williams. Eric Emm later replaced Draguns on bass. The group were later based in Chicago, with their name stemming from the German literary movement Sturm und Drang.

== History ==
Storm & Stress released two full-length albums on Touch and Go Records and toured the United States and Europe. Ian Williams later played guitar and keyboards in the band Battles; Eric Emm sings and plays guitar for Tanlines; Kevin Shea has made significant contributions to the experimental and free jazz scenes in New York, most notably with Talibam!. In 2014 Kevin Shea, George Draguns and guitarist Nick Millevoi released an album as Form and Mess; an obvious allusion to Shea and Draguns' former band Storm & Stress.

== Discography ==
- Storm & Stress (1997, Touch and Go)
- Under Thunder and Fluorescent Lights (2000, Touch and Go)
