= The Poison Arrows =

- Origin: Chicago, Illinois, U.S.
- Labels: Sound on Sound, File Thirteen, Coup Sur Coup

The Poison Arrows are a Chicago, Illinois-based band signed to File Thirteen Records. Band members include Justin Sinkovich (singer/guitarist of Atombombpocketknife), Pat Morris (bassist of Don Caballero) and Adam Reach. Their album, No Known Note, was released in April 2017. In 2022, War Regards was released.

== Discography ==
=== Albums ===
- Poison Arrows (2001, Sound on Sound)
- First Class, and Forever (2009, File Thirteen)
- Newfound Resolutions (August 3, 2010, File Thirteen)
- No Known Note (April 28, 2017)
- War Regards (2022, File Thirteen/Coup Sur Coup)

=== EPs ===
- Trailer Park (2004, File Thirteen)
- Premix (2006, digital download)
- Straight into the Drift (2007, File Thirteen)
- Casual Wave (2008, File Thirteen)
- FT90 split with My Way My Love (2018, Coup Sur Coup)
