= For Respect =

Studio album by Don Caballero
- Released: October 10, 1993
- Recorded: January 1993
- Genre: Indie rock
- Length: 37:48
- Label: Touch and Go
- Producer: Steve Albini

Don Caballero chronology
For Respect (1993)	Don Caballero 2 (1995)

For Respect is the debut album by Don Caballero, a Pittsburgh-based band. For Respect was released on Touch and Go Records in 1993.

Though Ian Williams is credited on guitar for this album, he only joined the band shortly before For Respect's recording and had little substantial creative influence. As a result, this album is much less orchestrated and complex than Don Caballero's later work. In a 2006 interview with the e-zine Space City Rock, Damon Che revealed that he played guitar on some Don Caballero songs, including the choruses of "Well Built Road".

== SCTV ==
The album contains several allusions and references to the Canadian sketch comedy show Second City Television:

- The band took its name from an episode of SCTV in which TV station manager Guy Caballero became a Corleone-esque mob boss called Don Caballero. "For respect" is Guy Caballero's justification for using a wheelchair.
- On the back cover of the CD insert, drummer Damon Che is photographed sitting in a wheelchair dressed as Guy Caballero.
- The audio samples in "Got a Mile, Got a Mile, Got an Inch" are all from SCTV. In one, someone asks Guy Caballero "I thought you rode a wheelchair?", to which he responds "Oh, I just use that for respect."
- "Subdued Confections" is yet another quote from SCTV.

== Critical reception ==
Professional ratings
Review scores
Source	Rating
AllMusic	4.5/5 stars

Trouser Press wrote: "Dynamic, driving, distorted and entirely free of indulgent improvisation, the eleven tracks — from the Melvins-like title cut to the ambling spareness of 'Subdued Confections' and the frenzied vectors of 'Belted Sweater' — underscore the value of talent in producing rugged instrumental music that’s really saying something."

== Track listing ==
No.	Title	Length
1.	"For Respect"	2:43
2.	"Chief Sitting Duck"	2:21
3.	"New Laws"	5:54
4.	"Nicked and Liqued"	2:41
5.	"Rocco"	2:47
6.	"Subdued Confections"	2:29
7.	"Got a Mile, Got a Mile, Got an Inch"	5:06
8.	"Our Caballero"	2:07
9.	"Bears See Things Pretty Much the Way They Are"	3:26
10.	"Well Built Road"	6:05
11.	"Belted Sweater"	2:06
Total length:		37:45

== Personnel ==
- Don Caballero:
  - Damon Che – drums; guitar on "Well Built Road"
  - Ian Williams – guitar
  - Pat Morris – bass guitar
  - Mike Banfield – guitar
- Steve Albini – producer
