= American Don =

Studio album by Don Caballero
- Released: October 3, 2000
- Recorded: 2000
- Studio: Electrical Audio (Chicago, Illinois)
- Genres: Math rock; instrumental rock
- Length: 55:48
- Label: Touch and Go
- Producer: Steve Albini

Don Caballero chronology
Singles Breaking Up (Vol. 1) (1999)	American Don (2000)	World Class Listening Problem (2006)

American Don is the fourth studio album by American math rock band Don Caballero, released on Touch and Go in 2000. It was recorded by Steve Albini. It is the first and only album to feature bassist Eric Emm and the final album for guitarist Ian Williams.

== Background ==
American Don is Don Caballero's fifth full-length release and fourth proper studio album, but many fans consider it the group's final album due to the falling out between Ian Williams and Damon Che, the group's creative core, after the release of the album. Che is actually the only original member of Don Caballero to play on this and all subsequent recordings.

The photos of car accidents in the CD booklet proved prophetic, as this lineup of Don Caballero disbanded after being involved in a harrowing van accident while touring in support of American Don. Singer/guitarist Fred Weaver was the opening act on this tour and his exhaustive tour diary was published in issue 16 of Chunklet as "The Dark Final Days of Don Caballero".

== Track listing ==
No.	Title	Length
1.	"Fire Back About Your New Baby's Sex"	4:42
2.	"The Peter Criss Jazz"	10:35
3.	"Haven't Lived Afro Pop"	7:34
4.	"You Drink a Lot of Coffee for a Teenager"	2:41
5.	"Ones All Over the Place"	9:00
6.	"I Never Liked You"	4:59
7.	"Details on How to Get ICEMAN on Your License Plate"	5:35
8.	"A Lot of People Tell Me I Have a Fake British Accent"	5:23
9.	"Let's Face It Pal, You Didn't Need That Eye Surgery"	5:09

== Reception ==
Professional ratings
Review scores
Source	Rating
Allmusic	4/5 stars
Fake Jazz	(10/12)
Pitchfork	(7.5/10)
Splendid E-zine	favorable

== Personnel ==
=== Don Caballero ===
- Damon Che – drums
- Ian Williams – guitar
- Eric Emm – bass guitar

=== Technical ===
- Steve Albini - recording engineer (credited only as "the proprietor" of Electrical Audio Studio A)
