= What Burns Never Returns =

Studio album by Don Caballero
- Released: June 9, 1998
- Recorded: Late 1997
- Studio: White Room Studios (Detroit, Michigan)
- Genre: Math rock
- Length: 47:25
- Label: Touch and Go
- Producer: Al Sutton

Don Caballero chronology
Don Caballero 2 (1995)	What Burns Never Returns (1998)	Singles Breaking Up (Vol. 1) (1999)

Professional ratings
Review scores
Source	Rating
AllMusic	4/5 stars
The A.V. Club	favorable
Chronicles of Chaos	7/10
Pitchfork Media	8.2/10

What Burns Never Returns is the third album by American math rock band Don Caballero. What Burns Never Returns was released on Touch and Go Records in 1998 and was a reunion of sorts for the band—it was their first album after a two-year hiatus and marked the return of the original line-up.

The album is notable for guitarist Ian Williams' first significant experimentation with pedals and other electronic effects. This style would be prevalent in both Williams' and the band's subsequent work.

It is the final studio album to feature guitarist Mike Banfield and bassist Pat Morris, both of whom were in the original line-up of Don Caballero.

== Track listing ==
No.	Title	Length
1.	"Don Caballero 3"	9:42
2.	"In the Absence of Strong Evidence to the Contrary, One May Step Out of the Way of the Charging Bull"	4:35
3.	"Delivering the Groceries at 138 Beats Per Minute"	5:49
4.	"Slice Where You Live like Pie"	5:09
5.	"Room Temperature Suite"	5:31
6.	"The World in Perforated Lines"	3:52
7.	"From the Desk of Elsewhere Go"	7:51
8.	"June Is Finally Here"	4:56
Total length:		47:25

Track 5 is a medley of the songs "Trey Dog's Acid" and "Room Temperature Lounge", both of which were released as a seven-inch single on Touch and Go Records in 1997, then re-released on Singles Breaking Up (Vol. 1) in 1999.

== Personnel ==
Don Caballero

- Damon Che – drums, guitar (track 3, 8)
- Ian Williams – guitar
- Pat Morris – bass guitar
- Mike Banfield – guitar

Technical

- Al Sutton – producer
- Robert Ebeling – mixing
- Andy Vogt – photography, artwork
