= Dross Glop =

Remix album by Battles
- Released: April 16, 2012
- Recorded: 2011–2012
- Genres: Experimental rock; dance; EDM; minimal techno; hip-hop
- Length: 69:02; 15:54 (Dross Glop 1); 14:33 (Dross Glop 2); 19:35 (Dross Glop 3); 17:35 (Dross Glop 4)
- Label: Warp
- Producer: Various

Battles chronology
Gloss Drop (2011)	Dross Glop (2012)	La Di Da Di (2015)

Professional ratings
Aggregate scores
Source	Rating
Metacritic	63/100
Review scores
Source	Rating
AllMusic	3.5/5 stars
Clash	7/10
DIY	3.5/5 stars
Gigwise	7/10 stars
The Guardian	3/5 stars
MusicOMH	3/5 stars
Pitchfork	7.8/10
Q	2/5 stars
The Skinny	3/5 stars
Slant Magazine	2/5 stars

Dross Glop is a remix compilation album by American experimental rock band Battles. It was released on April 16, 2012, and compiles remixes by various artists of Battles' songs from Gloss Drop (2011), eleven of which were originally released over a series of four 12-inch singles. The compilation includes a remix of "Sundome" that was not included on any of the vinyl releases.

The four 12" singles were numbered from 1 to 4, and were announced on Battles' website and Facebook page, and released from February (the first on February 6/7 internationally and in the US, respectively) to April 2012. The final part, Dross Glop 4, was released on Record Store Day 2012 (April 21), following the release of this compilation.

The album title is a spoonerism of the title of the band's album Gloss Drop, which the original versions of the songs are from. All four of the vinyl sleeves and the compilation's cover are also based on the initial art for Gloss Drop, intermixing different colored paints on the pink of the original sculpture.

== Reception ==
Dross Glop received a score of 63/100 on Metacritic, indicating "generally favorable reviews". musicOMH summarised that the album was "unchallenging territory" for the band, giving it three out of five stars.

Slant Magazine's Kevin Liedel, in a two-out-of-five stars review, opined that "while the album's contributors lean in a well-intentioned direction, preferring organic, innovative methods over simply pasting some vocal lines and guitar riffs on top of standard, synth-driven BPMs, Dross Glop is, at best, uneven," also calling it "scattershot, meandering, awkward, and often boring".

PopMatters' John Garratt said, "The best remix albums can capture the listener's imagination and take it down bold new paths. But in this case, if you want bold imagination, you really should side with the original Gloss Drop."

More positive reviews came from such publications as Pitchfork, who awarded the album 7.8 out of 10, and acclaimed Hudson Mohawke's remix of "Rolls Bayce", calling it "an unexpectedly soft and emotive take from the Glasgow producer"; Kode9's remix of "Africastle", saying it is a "seven-minute, house-focused mini set of sorts, fizzing and grinding ominously before slamming into a kind of chiptune dancehall dance party"; and Qluster's "Dominican Fade", which "pairs prim horns with beautiful organ glimmers, sounding nothing like the source material but no worse for it."

AllMusic's Heather Phares gave the album 3.5 out of 5 stars, and said "Gang Gang Dance gives Gloss Drop single 'Ice Cream' one of the most playful and successful treatments, adding to it a futuristic Latin twist with dive-bombing bass, a low-rider beat, and chanting vocals," also noting that "Like many remix collections, Dross Glop doesn't flow particularly well, and it's not quite as dazzling as Gloss Drop, but it once again shows that Battles are up for anything."

== Track listing ==
No.	Title	Remixer(s)	Length
1.	"Wall Street" (Gui Boratto Remix)	Gui Boratto	7:01
2.	"Sweetie & Shag" (The Field Remix)	The Field	8:53
3.	"Futura" (The Alchemist Remix)	The Alchemist	3:47
4.	"White Electric" (Shabazz Palaces Remix)	Shabazz Palaces	3:43
5.	"Africastle" (Kode9 Remix)	Kode9	7:03
6.	"Inchworm" (Silent Servant Remix Edit)	Silent Servant	6:07* (8:17)
7.	"Toddler" (Kangding Ray Remix Edit)	Kangding Ray	5:29* (7:36)
8.	"Dominican Fade" (Qluster Remix)	Qluster	3:42
9.	"Ice Cream" (BDG #Gang Gang Dance Remix)	Brian DeGraw of Gang Gang Dance	4:07
10.	"Rolls Bayce" (Hudson Mohawke Remix)	Hudson Mohawke	4:17
11.	"My Machines" (Patrick Mahoney and Dennis McNany Remix)	Patrick Mahoney, Dennis McNany	9:11
12.	"Sundome" (Eye Remix)	Yamantaka Eye	5:42
Total length:			69:02

* These tracks were edited for the CD release, but are included on the vinyl formats in their original full-length forms.

=== Dross Glop 1 ===
Released February 6, 2012 internationally and February 7 in the US.

No.	Title	Remixer(s)	Length
1.	"Wall Street" (Gui Boratto Mix)	Gui Boratto	7:01
2.	"Sweetie & Shag" (The Field Remix)	The Field	8:53
Total length:			15:54

=== Dross Glop 2 ===
Released February 20, 2012 internationally and February 21 in the US.

Side one
No.	Title	Remixer(s)	Length
1.	"Futura" (The Alchemist Remix)	The Alchemist	3:47
2.	"White Electric" (Shabazz Palaces Remix)	Shabazz Palaces	3:43

Side two
No.	Title	Remixer(s)	Length
1.	"Africastle" (Kode9 Remix)	Kode9	7:03

=== Dross Glop 3 ===
Released on March 19, 2012, internationally and March 20 in the US.

Side one
No.	Title	Remixer(s)	Length
1.	"Inchworm" (Silent Servant Remix)	Silent Servant	8:17

Side two
No.	Title	Remixer(s)	Length
1.	"Toddler" (Kangding Ray Remix)	Kangding Ray	7:36
2.	"Dominican Fade" (Qluster Remix)	Qluster	3:42

=== Dross Glop 4 ===
Released April 21, 2012 (Record Store Day) in the US and internationally.

Side one
No.	Title	Remixer(s)	Length
1.	"Ice Cream" (BDG #Gang Gang Dance Remix)	Brian DeGraw of Gang Gang Dance	4:07
2.	"Rolls Bayce" (Hudson Mohawke Remix)	Hudson Mohawke	4:17

Side two
No.	Title	Remixer(s)	Length
1.	"My Machines" (Patrick Mahoney & Dennis McNany Remix)	Patrick Mahoney, Dennis McNany	9:11
