= María Figueroa =

Spanish singer

- Born: 27 April 2000 (age 26)
- Origin: Alhaurín de la Torre Province of Málaga, Spain
- Genres: Pop
- Occupation: Singer
- Instrument: Vocals
- Years active: 2005–present

María Figueroa (born 27 April 2000) is a Spanish singer. She became famous at age of five in 2005 when she appeared the children's program Menuda Noche (broadcast on Canal Sur, presented by Juan y Medio). María is famous for her song "Me llamo María (Yo tengo mi pompón)" ("My Name is Maria (I Have My Pom-pom)"), which was released as her first single, and is sometimes referred to simply as la niña del pompón ("the pom-pom girl").

== Discography ==
=== Albums ===
Year	Title	Charts
Year	Title	SPA
2005	Menuda es	63
2006	Pomponmanía guapa	—

== Music videos ==
Year	Title
2005	"Me llamo María (Yo tengo mi pompón)"
2006	"Guasa"
