= World Class Listening Problem =

2006 album by Don Caballero

Studio album by Don Caballero
- Released: May 16, 2006
- Recorded: Rustbelt Studios
- Genre: Math rock
- Length: 44:55
- Label: Relapse Records
- Producer: Al Sutton

Don Caballero chronology
American Don (2000)	World Class Listening Problem (2006)	Punkgasm (2008)

Professional ratings
Review scores
Source	Rating
Allmusic	3.5/5 stars
Decibel	(favorable)
Delusions of Adequacy	(favorable)
Pitchfork Media	(5.3/10)

World Class Listening Problem is the fifth full-length studio album by math rock band Don Caballero. Damon Che is the only member of the original lineup appearing on this record.

== Track listing ==
No.	Title	Length
1.	"Mmmmm Acting, I Love Me Some Good Acting"	5:54
2.	"Sure We Had Knives Around"	5:19
3.	"And and and, He Lowered the Twin Down"	4:15
4.	"I Agree..... No!..... I Disagree"	4:32
5.	"Palm Trees in the Fecking Bahamas"	3:54
6.	"World Class Listening Problem"	4:50
7.	"Railroad Cancellation"	5:18
8.	"Theme from Bricktop Clowns"	1:49
9.	"Savage Composition"	4:42
10.	"I'm Goofballs for Bozzo Jazz"	4:35

== Personnel ==
Don Caballero

- Damon Che – drums
- Eugene Doyle – guitars
- Jeffery Ellsworth – guitars
- Jason Jouver – bass guitars

Production

- Al Sutton – recording engineer
- Dan Curie – assistant engineer
- Alan Douches – mastering

== Miscellanea ==
The phrase "World Class Listening Problem" first entered the Don Caballero lexicon in late 1999 as the provisional title of the American Don song "Details On How To Get ICEMAN On Your License Plate".

All of the songs were recorded live in the studio with little or no overdubs or edits. Che remarks that this led producer Al Sutton to say that they were the first band he'd ever worked with who could actually play their songs.

"Savage Composition" and "I'm Goofballs For Bozo Jazz" started as one song called "Heavily Beautiful" (as heard on the Fall 2003 tour), before being split into two.

In a 2006 interview with Resound magazine, Damon Che described "And And And, He Lowered The Twin Down" as "a sequel of sorts," presumably to the 1993 Don Caballero single "ANDANDANDANDANDANDANDANDANDAND". At a 2003 show in Cleveland, Ohio, Che introduced the song with a "terrible story" of twins. Of the twins, only one was slender enough to be lowered through the hole of a roof. The song is about what happened when the twin got in there.

"Railroad Cancellation" was featured in the season two finale of the FX series Sons of Anarchy.
