= Tonto+ =

EP by Battles
- Released: October 22, 2007
- Genre: Math rock
- Length: 42:44
- Label: Warp

Battles chronology
Mirrored (2007)	Tonto+ (2007)	Gloss Drop (2011)

Professional ratings
Review scores
Source	Rating
Pitchfork	7.0/10

Tonto+ is a 2007 EP by Battles. It consists of a CD and a DVD. The CD contains the title track, remixes, and live performances, and the DVD has videos for the title track and "Atlas", another song off Battles' debut album Mirrored.

The cover resembles Section 25's From the Hip.

== Track listing ==
CD
No.	Title	Length
1.	"Tonto++(Ilia)"	7:42
2.	"Tonto+" (The Field Remix)	8:18
3.	"Tonto" (Four Tet Remix)	9:20
4.	"Tonto" (Live at FRF 07)	9:08
5.	"Leyendecker" (Live at FRF 07)	3:41
6.	"Leyendecker" (DJ Emz Remix featuring Joell Ortiz)	4:37

12" vinyl
No.	Title	Length
1.	"Tonto"
2.	"Tonto" (The Field Remix)
3.	"Tonto" (Four Tet Remix)
4.	"Leyendecker" (DJ Emz Remix featuring Joell Ortiz)

== Release history ==
Country	Release date
Worldwide	October 22, 2007
United States	November 6, 2007

|Spain |December 5, 2019 |{Tonto+++(Ilia)}
