= Dave Konopka =

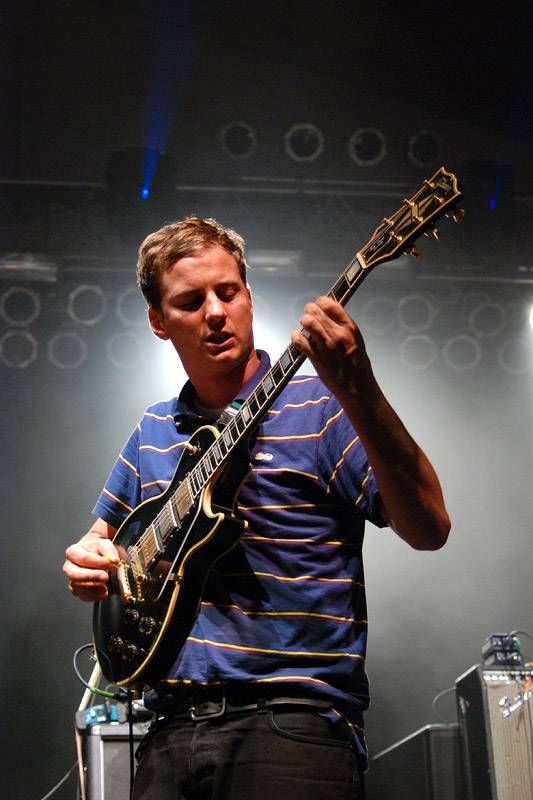
- Dave Konopka of Battles performing at the 2008 Bonnaroo Music Festival in Manchester, Tennessee

Background information
- Born: September 2, 1976 (age 49)
- Genres: Math rock, experimental rock
- Occupation: Musician
- Instruments: Guitar, bass
- Label: Warp

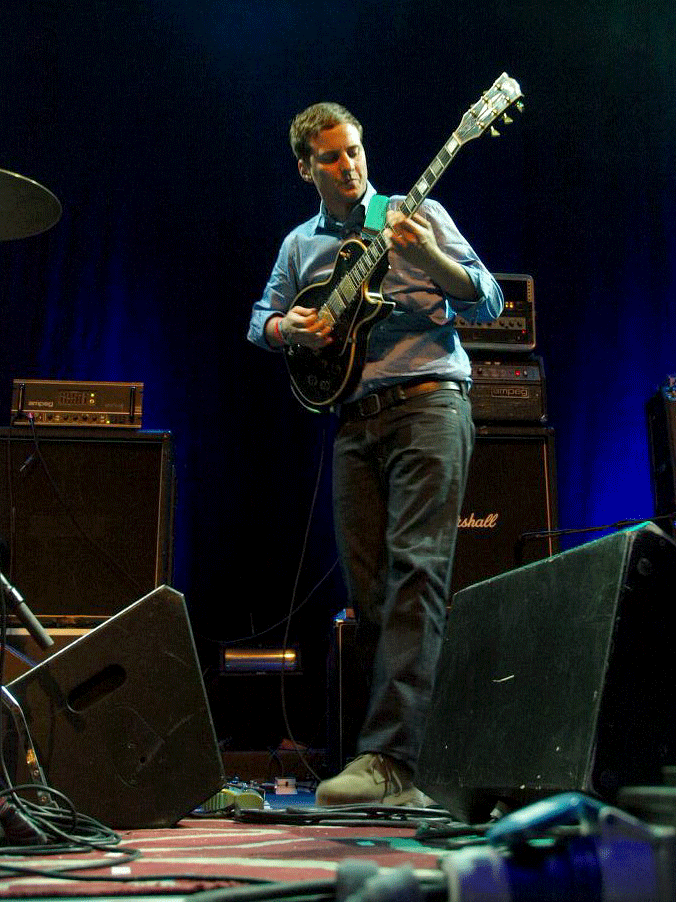
Dave Konopka, Moers Festival 2008

Dave Konopka is an American musician who is best known as the former bassist and guitarist in the experimental rock band Battles. A graphic design major at the Massachusetts College of Art and Design, he also designed the band's record covers and tour posters. Konopka departed Battles in 2018.

== Biography ==
Prior to joining Battles, he was in the Boston-based math rock band Lynx, which released a self-titled debut album on Box Factory Records in 2000.

== Setup ==
=== (2011 – Present) ===
Guitars

- Gibson Les Paul '57 custom Black Beauty
- G&L ASAT Bass

Pedals

- Line 6 DL4 – X 2
- EHX POG2
- EHX Micro POG
- EHX Holy Grail Reverb
- EHX Freeze Sound Retainer
- Fulltone OCD distortion pedal
- Boss Pitch Shifter Delay – X 2
- Boss TU-3 Chromatic Floor Tuner
- Boss AB-2
- Xotic EP – Booster

Rack Mount Units

- Gibson Echoplex – X 2 w/Footswitches

Amplifiers

- Mesa Boogie M9 Carbine Bass Amplifier – X 2
- Ampeg B-115e Cabinet
- Bergantino 4x12 Cabinet
- Bergantino 6x10 Cabinet

== Discography ==
=== As a band member ===
- Lynx – Lynx (2000)
- Battles – EP C / B EP (2006)
- Battles – Mirrored (2007)
- Battles – Gloss Drop (2011)
- Battles – La Di Da Di (2015)
- Lynx – Human Speech EP (2023)

=== Singles ===
- "Tras" (June 15, 2004, 12")
- "Atlas" (April 2007, 12")
- "Tonto" (October 2007)
- "The Line" (August 2010, digital download)
- "Ice Cream" (March 2011, 12")
- "My Machines" (August 2011, 12")

=== As a contributor ===
- Tonto+ (Warp Records; October 22, 2007 world, November 6, 2007, USA)
- Dross Glop 1 (first in a four-part 12" vinyl remix series; Warp Records; February 6/7, 2012)
- Dross Glop 2 (second in four-part 12" vinyl remix series; Warp Records; February 20/21, 2012)
- Dross Glop 3 (third in four-part 12" vinyl remix series; Warp Records; March 19/20, 2012)
- Dross Glop 4 (fourth and final in four-part 12" vinyl remix series; Warp Records; Record Store Day, April 21, 2012)
- Dross Glop (CD compilation of the four-part 12" vinyl remixes; April 16/17, 2012)
