= Ian Williams (musician) =

American singer-songwriter and guitarist

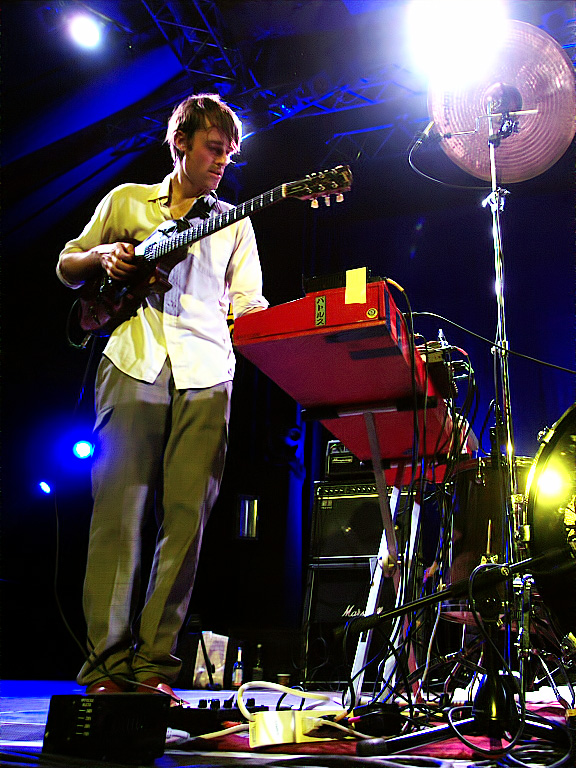
- Ian Williams at the 2008 Moers Festival

Background information
- Born: August 31, 1970 (age 56); Johnstown, Pennsylvania
- Genres: Experimental rock; math rock; instrumental rock; post-rock; progressive rock
- Occupation: Musician
- Instruments: Vocals; keyboards; guitar
- Years active: 1992–present
- Member of: Battles: Don Caballero
- Formerly of: Storm & Stress

Ian Williams (born August 31, 1970) is an American rock guitarist and singer-songwriter. He became noted for his finger tapping guitar playing in bands such as Don Caballero, Storm & Stress and currently in Battles. He is known for his one-handed guitar playing technique, often while playing keyboards or Ableton Push simultaneously with the other hand.

== Biography ==
Williams was born in Pittsburgh, Pennsylvania, and spent part of his childhood in Malawi, before returning to the US in the 6th grade.

He graduated from the University of Pittsburgh in Pittsburgh, where he studied history and political science.

=== Musical career ===
In his teenage years Williams was a drummer and vocalist for Pittsburgh-based band 'Sludgehammer'.

Williams joined Pittsburgh math rock pioneers Don Caballero as a second guitarist in 1992 until 2000. He had also played in the Chicago-based, avant-garde band Storm & Stress from 1997 to 2000. Williams moved to New York City in the early 2000s and formed Battles in 2002.

Williams is well known for his approach to finger tapping on guitar and uses Gibson's Echoplex looping system. His propensity towards guitar tapping allows him to accompany himself on keyboard at live performances, using one hand for each instrument.

Williams made a short cameo appearance in the 2000 film High Fidelity as a customer in the record store (shortly after John Cusack's character announces, "I will now sell five copies of The Three E.P.'s by The Beta Band."). He also had small cameos in Heaven's a Drag and Bloodmoon, a 1997 martial arts action film.

== Setup ==
=== (Battles: 2004 - 2010) ===
Guitars

- Gibson Les Paul Studio

Keyboards

- M-Audio ProKeys Sono 88

Software

- Native Instruments Kontakt 4

Computers

- Apple Mac

Rack Mount Units

- Gibson Echoplex Digital Pro - w/Footswitch

Amplifiers

- Roland JC-120
- Ampeg SVT VR Head
- Marshall 4x12 Cabinet

=== (Battles: 2011 - present) ===
Guitars

- Gibson Les Paul
- Gibson SG

Keyboards

- M-Audio Axiom 61 - X 2 (2011 - 2013)
- Novation 61 SL MkII (2014 - 2016)
- M-Audio Keystation 61 II (2014–Present)

Software

- Native Instruments Kontakt 5
- Ableton Live
- Mainstage (Software) (2011 - 2013)

Sequencer

- Akai APC40 (2011 - 2013)
- Ableton Push (2014–Present)

Computers

- Apple Mac - X 2 (2011 - 2013)
- Apple Mac - X 1 (2014–Present)
- Apogee Duet

Rack Mount Units

- Gibson Echoplex Digital Pro - w/Footswitch (2011 - 2013)

MIDI Footswitches

- Roland FC-300 (2011 - 2013)
- Keith McMillen SoftStep 2 (2014–Present)

Amplifiers

- Roland JC-120
- Ampeg SVT-VR Head
- Ampeg SVT-CL Head
- Ampeg 6x12 Cabinet
- Marshall 4x12 Cabinet

== Discography ==
=== As a band member ===
- Don Caballero – For Respect (1993)
- Don Caballero – Don Caballero 2 (1995)
- Don Caballero – What Burns Never Returns (1998)
- Don Caballero – Singles Breaking Up (Vol. 1) (1999)
- Don Caballero – American Don (2000)
- Storm & Stress – Storm and Stress (1997)
- Storm & Stress – Under Thunder & Fluorescent Lights (2000)
- Battles – EP C / B EP (2006)
- Battles – Mirrored (2007)
- Battles – Gloss Drop (2011)
- Battles – La Di Da Di (2015)
- Battles – Juice B Crypts (2019)
