= List of Helmet band members =

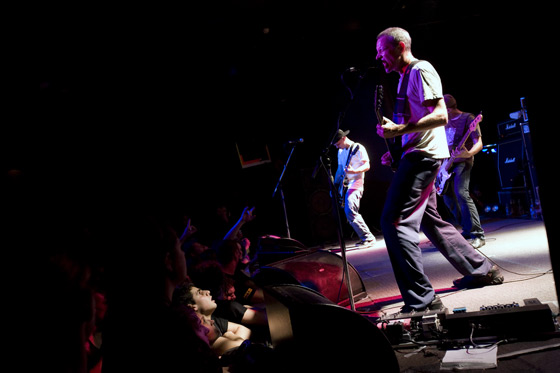
Helmet performing in 2008.

Helmet is an American alternative metal band from New York City, New York. Formed in 1989, the group originally featured guitarist and vocalist Page Hamilton, guitarist Peter Mengede, bassist Henry Bogdan, and drummer John Stanier. The group released its debut album Strap It On in 1990, followed by Meantime in 1992 on Interscope Records. Due to increased tensions with frontman Hamilton, Mengede was fired from the band on February 17, 1993. After his dismissal, the guitarist went on to form the supergroup Handsome. Rob Echeverria was enlisted to perform on the 1994 album Betty, although he left the band after the touring cycle for Betty ended in 1996 to join Biohazard. Helmet recorded Aftertaste as a three-piece, with Hamilton performing all guitars. After touring with former Orange 9mm guitarist Chris Traynor, the band broke up in 1998.

In 2003, it was announced that Helmet had reformed with bassist Rob "Blasko" Nicholson and drummer John Tempesta joining Hamilton and Traynor. A spokesperson for Hamilton later debunked the news, but noted that Hamilton and Traynor were working on an unidentified project. In early 2004, the Helmet reformation was officially announced, with recently former Anthrax bassist Frank Bello and drummer Tempesta joining the group. Helmet's fifth album, Size Matters, was released in late 2004. Bello left to return to Anthrax in early 2005, with Jeremy Chatelain (Mengede's former bandmate in Handsome) taking his place for remaining tour dates. Tempesta left in early 2006 to join The Cult, with Mike Jost taking his place a few months later. In September, after the release of Monochrome, more lineup changes were announced as both Traynor and Jost left the group. New additions Kyle Stevenson (drums) and Jon Fuller (bass) were announced the following month, which also marked Chatelain's departure. Jimmy Thompson was also announced as the guitarist to replace Traynor. Later in 2006, Rob De Luca briefly replaced Fuller as bassist for a Canadian tour, although Fuller returned shortly afterwards. In late 2007, Thompson left the band, and he was replaced by Dan Beeman the following February.

Helmet returned with the new studio album Seeing Eye Dog in 2010, which featured a returning Traynor on bass; Dave Case was officially announced as the group's new touring bassist around the same time. The band released its eighth studio album Dead to the World in 2016, which was the first to feature Case. Helmet's ninth album, Left, followed in 2025. It was the first time that the band's lineup stayed intact for two successive albums since 1990's Strap It On and 1992's Meantime.

== Members ==
=== Current ===
Image	Name	Years active	Instruments	Release contributions
	Page Hamilton	1989–1998; 2004–present	lead guitar; lead vocals	all Helmet releases
	Kyle Stevenson	2006–present	drums; backing vocals	Seeing Eye Dog (2010) – including all bonus USB key live albums; Dead to the World (2016); Left (2023)
	Dan Beeman	2008–present	rhythm guitar; backing vocals	Seeing Eye Dog (2010) – including all bonus USB key live albums except Live in Detroit; Dead to the World (2016); Left (2023)
	Dave Case	2010–present	bass; backing vocals	Dead to the World (2016); Left (2023)

=== Former ===
Image	Name	Years active	Instruments	Release contributions
	Henry Bogdan	1989–1998	bass	all Helmet releases from Strap It On (1990) to Aftertaste (1997); Unsung: The Best of Helmet (2004); Live and Rare (2021)
	John Stanier	1989–1998	drums	all Helmet releases from Strap It On (1990) to Aftertaste (1997); Unsung: The Best of Helmet (2004); Live and Rare (2021)
	Peter Mengede	1989–1993	rhythm guitar	Strap It On (1990); Meantime (1992); Born Annoying (1995); Unsung: The Best of Helmet (2004); Live and Rare (2021)
	Rob Echeverria	1993–1996	rhythm guitar	Betty (1994); Unsung: The Best of Helmet (2004)
	Chris Traynor	1997–1998 (touring only); 2004–2006; 2010 (studio only)	rhythm guitar; backing vocals (plus studio bass 2004–2006, 2010)	Size Matters (2004); Monochrome (2006); Seeing Eye Dog (2010) – including Live at Warped Tour bonus disc
	John Tempesta	2004–2006	drums	Size Matters (2004)
	Frank Bello	2004–2005 (touring only)	bass; backing vocals	none
	Jeremy Chatelain	2005–2006 (touring only)	bass; backing vocals	Seeing Eye Dog (2010) – Live at Warped Tour bonus disc only
	Mike Jost	2006	drums	Monochrome (2006); Seeing Eye Dog (2010) – Live at Warped Tour bonus disc only
	Jon Fuller	2006; 2006–2010 (touring only)	bass, backing vocals	Seeing Eye Dog (2010) – bonus USB key live albums only
	Jimmy Thompson	2006–2007	rhythm guitar	Seeing Eye Dog (2010) – Live in Detroit bonus USB key live album only
	Rob De Luca	2006 (touring only)	bass; backing vocals	none

== Lineups ==
Period	Members	Releases
Early 1989 – February 1993	Page Hamilton – lead guitar, vocals; Peter Mengede – rhythm guitar; Henry Bogdan – bass; John Stanier – drums	Strap It On (1990); Meantime (1992); Born Annoying (1995); Live and Rare (2021)
Early 1993 – mid 1996	Page Hamilton – lead guitar, vocals; Henry Bogdan – bass; John Stanier – drums; Rob Echeverria – rhythm guitar	Betty (1994)
Mid 1996 – early 1997	Page Hamilton – guitars, vocals; Henry Bogdan – bass; John Stanier – drums	Aftertaste (1997)
Early 1997 – early 1998	Page Hamilton – lead guitar, lead vocals; Henry Bogdan – bass; John Stanier – drums; Chris Traynor – rhythm guitar, backing vocals (touring)	none – live performances only
Band inactive 1998–2004
March – June 2004	Page Hamilton – guitars, lead vocals; Chris Traynor – bass, backing vocals; John Tempesta – drums	Size Matters (2004)
June 2004 – April 2005	Page Hamilton – lead guitar, lead vocals; Chris Traynor – rhythm guitar, bass, backing vocals; John Tempesta – drums; Frank Bello – bass, backing vocals (touring)	none – live performances only
June 2005 – February 2006	Page Hamilton – lead guitar, lead vocals; Chris Traynor – rhythm guitar, bass, backing vocals; John Tempesta – drums; Jeremy Chatelain – bass, backing vocals (touring)	none – live performances only
May – August 2006	Page Hamilton – lead vocals, guitar; Chris Traynor – rhythm guitar, bass, backing vocals; Jeremy Chatelain – bass, backing vocals (touring); Mike Jost – drums	Monochrome (2006); Live at Warped Tour, San Francisco (2010)
August – November 2006	Page Hamilton – lead guitar, lead vocals; Kyle Stevenson – drums, backing vocals; Jon Fuller – bass, backing vocals (touring); Jimmy Thompson – rhythm guitar	none – live performances only
November – December 2006	Page Hamilton – lead guitar, lead vocals; Kyle Stevenson – drums, backing vocals; Jimmy Thompson – rhythm guitar; Rob De Luca – bass, backing vocals (touring)	none – live performances only
December 2006 – late 2007	Page Hamilton – lead guitar, lead vocals; Kyle Stevenson – drums, backing vocals; Jimmy Thompson – rhythm guitar; Jon Fuller – bass, backing vocals (touring)	Live in Detroit, Michigan (2010)
February 2008 – June 2010	Page Hamilton – lead guitar, lead vocals; Kyle Stevenson – drums, backing vocals; Jon Fuller – bass (touring); Dan Beeman – rhythm guitar, backing vocals	Seeing Eye Dog (2010); Live at Grasspop in Dessel, Belgium (2010); Live in Budapest, Hungary (2010); Live in Angouleme, France (2010)
June 2010 – present	Page Hamilton – lead guitar, lead vocals; Kyle Stevenson – drums, backing vocals; Dan Beeman – rhythm guitar, backing vocals; Dave Case – bass, backing vocals	Dead to the World (2016); Left (2023)
