= Helmet discography =

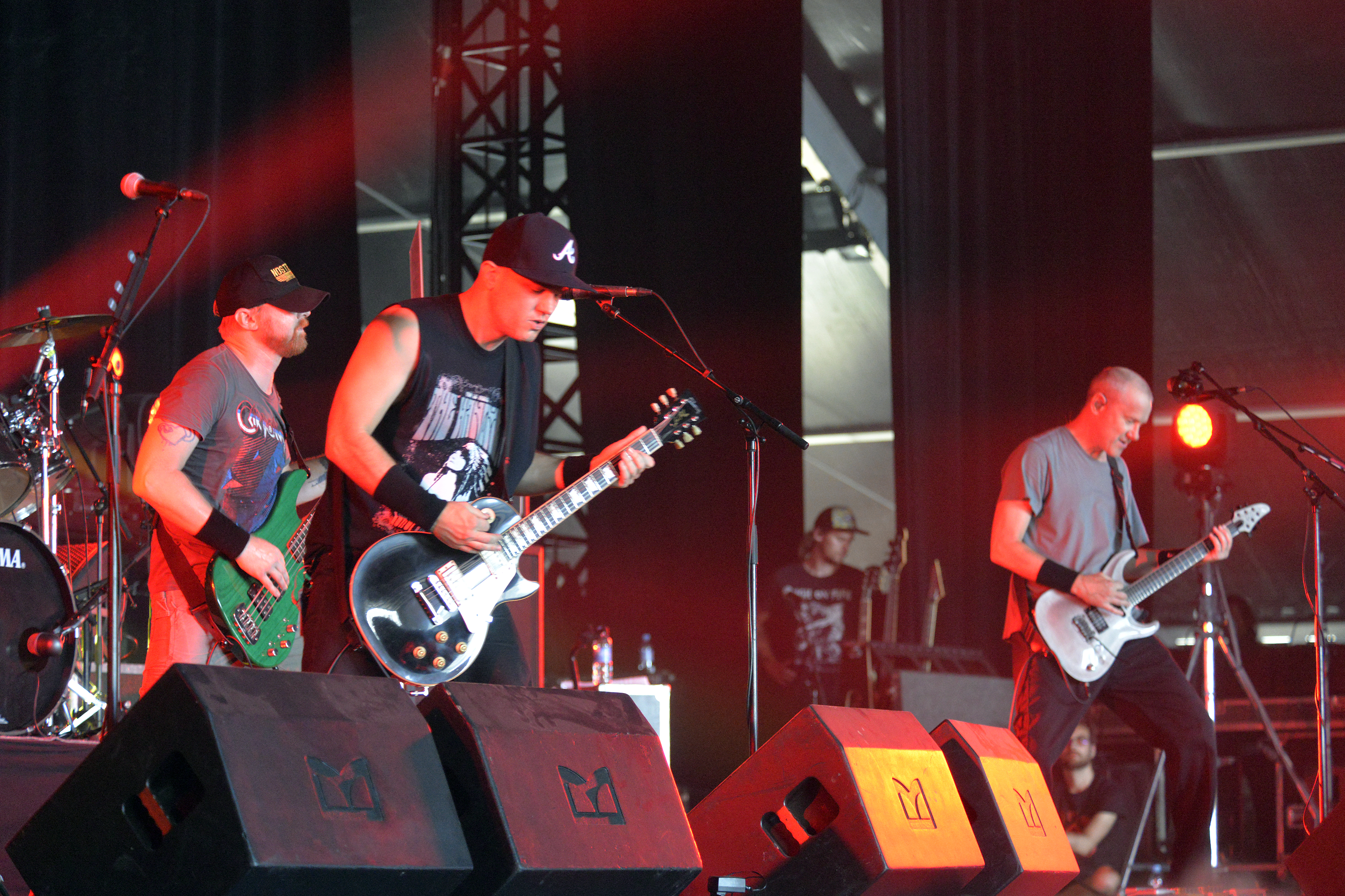
- Helmet in 2017
- Studio albums: 9
- Live albums: 2
- Compilation albums: 2
- Singles: 16
- Music videos: 14

The discography of Helmet, a New York–based alternative metal band formed in 1989, consists of nine full-length studio albums, two compilation albums, 15 singles, and 14 music videos. This list does not include material performed by members or former members of Helmet that was recorded with Adair, Anthrax, Band of Susans, Biohazard, The Cult, Disturbing the Peace, Exodus, Norma Jean, Testament, Tomahawk and White Zombie.

== Biography ==
Helmet appeared on the New York underground scene in 1989 after vocalist/guitarist Page Hamilton had left Band of Susans. They were spotted by Tom Hazelmyer and signed to his Amphetamine Reptile Records label, releasing their debut 7 inch single, "Born Annoying", later that year. The label then released their first album, Strap It On, in 1990. After touring in support of that album, Helmet signed to Interscope Records in 1991 and started recording their second album, Meantime, which was released a year later. Meantime was far more successful, peaking at number one on the Billboard Heatseekers chart, and in 68th position on Billboard 200. The critically acclaimed album also provided their first ever charting single "Unsung", which remains one of Helmet's live staples the album has sold over 2 million copies worldwide, and later became the band's only album to achieve Gold status in the United States.

After the release of Meantime, original guitarist Peter Mengede left Helmet on bad terms and was replaced by Rob Echeverria. The band returned to the studio with co-producer T-Ray in the fall of 1993, to record their third album. Betty, released in June 1994, earned the band its highest chart position, debuting at #45 on the Billboard 200 chart, with "Milquetoast", "Biscuits for Smut" and "Wilma's Rainbow" in particular becoming major rock radio hits at the time. Despite this, the album was not as successful as Meantime, and Echeverria soon left Helmet to join Biohazard. The band continued as a three-piece while recording their next album, Aftertaste, which was released in 1997. After recording was complete, guitarist Chris Traynor (formerly of Orange 9mm) was recruited for the supporting tour. Although "Exactly What You Wanted" became a moderate radio hit, the album spent only a few weeks on the Billboard 200 chart. In 1998, Helmet decided to break up after "9 years, 1600 shows" and 5 albums.

A long period of inactivity ended in early 2004 when Hamilton decided to resurrect Helmet, with a new lineup of John Tempesta on drums and Chris Traynor (guitarist on the Aftertaste tour) on bass. This lineup recorded the band's first post-reunion album Size Matters, which was released in September 2004. After recording was done, bassist Frank Bello was brought in so Traynor could return to guitar. However, Bello left before its conclusion to reunite with Anthrax, who was then reuniting with the "classic" Among the Living lineup. Jeremy Chatelain replaced Bello for the duration of the tour. Tempesta also left band in early 2006 to join the reunited Cult.

In late 2005, Helmet abandoned their fourteen-year relationship with Interscope and signed with Warcon Enterprises. The band had also announced that a new album was in the works for an early summer 2006 release. Helmet performed at the 2006 South by Southwest festival in Austin, Texas, with a temporary lineup consisting of Charlie Walker on drums, Chris Traynor on bass, and Anthony Truglio (formerly of Gandhi) on guitar. The new album, Monochrome, released in July 2006, was recorded and co-produced by Wharton Tiers, who recorded Helmet's first two albums. For the album, Hamilton and Traynor returned to the studio with newly recruited drummer, Mike Jost (formerly of Adair). Helmet headlined the 2006 Warped Tour in support of Monochrome, with Jeremy Chatelain reprising his role from the 2005 Size Matters tour.

Helmet's seventh studio album, Seeing Eye Dog, was released on September 7, 2010, via Work Song, the label imprint shared by singer/songwriter Joe Henry and Helmet mainman Page Hamilton's manager. The band did not release their next studio album, Dead to the World, until 2016.

On November 10, 2023, the band released their ninth album Left.

== Albums ==
=== Studio albums ===
Title	Album details	Peak chart positions										Sales	Certifications
Title	Album details	US	AUS	AUT	FIN	GER	NLD	NZ	SWE	SWI	UK	Sales	Certifications
Strap It On	Released: October 1990; Label: Amphetamine Reptile (89202-2); Format: CD, CS, LP	—	—	—	—	—	—	—	—	—	—	US: 40,000+	
Meantime	Released: June 23, 1992; Label: Interscope (92162-2); Format: CD, CS, LP	68	88	—	—	—	—	—	—	—	—	US: 604,000; WW: 2,000,000	RIAA: Gold
Betty	Released: June 21, 1994; Label: Interscope (92404-2); Format: CD, CS, LP, DI	45	23	18	—	16	71	43	13	32	38	US: 252,000; WW: 500,000	
Aftertaste	Released: March 18, 1997; Label: Interscope (INTD-90073); Format: CD, CS, LP	47	20	—	30	52	—	45	—	22	139	US: 132,000	
Size Matters	Released: October 5, 2004; Label: Interscope (B0002968-02); Format: CD	121	168	—	—	97	—	—	—	—	—		
Monochrome	Released: July 18, 2006; Label: Warcon (WRCN11); Format: CD, LP	159	158	—	—	—	—	—	—	—	—		
Seeing Eye Dog	Released: September 7, 2010; Label: Work Song (001); Format: CD, LP, DI	—	—	—	—	—	—	—	—	—	—		
Dead to the World	Released: October 28, 2016; Label: earMUSIC; Format: CD, LP	—	85	—	—	—	—	—	—	—	—		
Left	Released: November 10, 2023; Label: earMUSIC; Format: CD, LP	—	—	—	—	—	—	—	—	—	—		
"—" denotes a release that did not chart.

=== Compilation albums ===
Year	Album details
1995	Born Annoying: Released: 1995; Label: Amphetamine Reptile (AMREP 036); Format: CD, CS, LP
2003	The Instrumental Music of Helmet (1992–1997): Released: 2003; Label: Warner Music Group (WCM); Format: CD
2004	Unsung: The Best of Helmet (1991–1997): Released: January 27, 2004; Label: Interscope (000056002); Format: CD

=== Live albums ===
Year	Album details
2014	Live at Warped Tour San Francisco July 8, 2006: Released: 2014; Label: Not On Label, Self released; Format: MP3
2021	Live and Rare: Released: November 26, 2021; Label: earMUSIC (0215643EMU); Format: CD, LP

== Singles ==
Year	Song	Peak chart positions					Album
Year	Song	US Alt.	US Main.	AUS	NZ	UK	Album
1989	"Born Annoying"	—	—	—	—	—	Non-album single
1991	"Unsung"	29	32	182	—	—	Meantime
1992	"In the Meantime"	—	—	—	—	—	Meantime
1992	"Give It"	—	—	—	—	—	Meantime
1993	"Just Another Victim" (with House of Pain)	—	—	—	28	—	Judgment Night soundtrack
1993	"Primitive/Born Annoying (1993)"	—	—	—	—	—	Born Annoying
1994	"Milquetoast"	—	39	—	—	—	Betty
1994	"Biscuits for Smut"	—	—	117	—	78	Betty
1994	"Wilma's Rainbow"	—	—	109	—	—	Betty
1997	"Exactly What You Wanted"	—	19	167	—	—	Aftertaste
1997	"Like I Care"	—	—	—	—	—	Aftertaste
2004	"See You Dead"	—	29	—	—	—	Size Matters
2004	"Unwound"	—	—	—	—	—	Size Matters
2005	"Smart"	—	—	—	—	—	Size Matters
2006	"Gone"	—	—	—	—	—	Monochrome
2006	"Monochrome"	—	—	—	—	—	Monochrome
2007	"Money Shot"	—	—	—	—	—	Monochrome
2021	"In the Ditch"	—	—	—	—	—	Non-album singles
2021	"Move On" (Note: Released as a singles box set with four different vinyls.)	—	—	—	—	—	Non-album singles
2023	"Holiday"	—	—	—	—	—	LEFT
2023	"Gun Fluf"	—	—	—	—	—	LEFT
2023	"Big Shot"	—	—	—	—	—	LEFT
"—" denotes a release that did not chart.

== Music videos ==
- "Bad Mood" (1991)
- "Blacktop" (1991)
- "Unsung" (John Peel Version) (1991)
- "Unsung" (1992)
- "Give It" (1992)
- "In the Meantime" (1993)
- "Milquetoast" (1994)
- "Biscuits for Smut" (1994)
- "Wilma's Rainbow" (1994)
- "Gigantor" (1995)
- "Exactly What You Wanted" (1997)
- "Smart" (2005)
- "Gone" (2006)
- "Monochrome" (2006)
- "Money Shot" (2007)
- "So Long" (2011)
- "Life or Death"(2017)
- "Holiday" (2023)
- "Gun Fluf" (2023)
- "Big Shot" (2023)

== Other appearances ==
Year	Title	Album
1990	"Impressionable"	Dope, Guns 'n' Fucking in the Street Vol. 5
1993	"Just Another Victim" with House of Pain	Judgment Night: Music from the Motion Picture
1994	"Milktoast"	The Crow Original Motion Picture Soundtrack
1994	"Turned Out (Live)"	Jabberjaw No. 1
1994	"Lord of This World"	Volume Eleven: Reading Special
1995	"Custard Pie" with David Yow	Encomium: A Tribute to Led Zeppelin
1995	"Symptom of the Universe"	The Jerky Boys: Original Motion Picture Soundtrack
1995	"Complete"	Johnny Mnemonic soundtrack
1995	"Gigantor"	Saturday Morning: Cartoons' Greatest Hits
1996	"Disagreeable"	Feeling Minnesota soundtrack
1996	"Army of Me"	MOM: Music for Our Mother Ocean
2005	"Unsung"	Whatever: The '90s Pop & Culture Box
2005	"Out of Nowhere"	Chrysalis Music 2005 Sundance Film Festival Promo Sampler
2006	"Bury Me"	Warped Tour 2006 Tour Compilation
2007	"Revenge Destroys Everything"	Tatua Soundtrack
2011	"Crazy Nights"	Guilt by Association Vol. 3
2013	"Anything and Everything"	2013 Invasion (split with Melvins)
