= The Sound of Winter =

Single by Bush

from the album The Sea of Memories
- Released: 22 July 2011
- Recorded: 2010–11
- Genre: Alternative rock
- Length: 3:31
- Label: Zuma Rock
- Songwriter: Gavin Rossdale
- Producer: Bob Rock

Bush singles chronology
"The Afterlife" (2010)	"The Sound of Winter" (2011)	"Baby Come Home" (2012)

"The Sound of Winter" is a song by British band Bush. The song is the second single released from the band's fifth studio album The Sea of Memories.

== Music video ==
Directed by Meiert Avis and produced by Jeremy Alter, on 9 and 10 August in Malibu, California, the music video opens in similar fashion to that of the music video for the song "Yellow" by Coldplay, with Gavin Rossdale walking down the beach on a cold, grey morning singing the first verse and chorus. Afterwards the video unfolds into a blissful summer party with jamming, shooting pool, and guitar playing on the beach. Chris Traynor's wife and daughter also appear in the video.

== Release and promotion ==
The song was the second single released from the band's fifth studio album "The Sea of Memories", and was released on 22 July 2011. The band appeared on Jimmy Kimmel Live! on 21 July, debuting the song to promote the album. The band also performed the song on The Tonight Show with Jay Leno on 22 September and Discovery Channel's American Chopper Live on 6 December 2011. Their Chopper appearance marked the series' second highest rated episode to date. The song was also featured on the television series The Lying Game, the NHL 12 soundtrack and in the 2013 film The Call.

== Commercial performance ==
On 18 October 2011, "The Sound of Winter" topped the Alternative Songs chart, knocking off "Walk" by the Foo Fighters. It was the band's fifth number-one hit single on the chart (their first in 12 years, since 1999's "The Chemicals Between Us"), as well as their first self-released single to reach number one on the alternative radio chart. On 19 November, it topped the Rock Songs chart, becoming their first number-one song on the chart.

== Charts ==
=== Weekly charts ===
Chart (2011–12)	Peak position
Canada Hot 100 (Billboard)	71
Canada Rock (Billboard)	1
CIS Airplay (TopHit)	169
Italy Airplay (FIMI)	166
Mexico Ingles Airplay (Billboard)	32
US Bubbling Under Hot 100 (Billboard)	4
US Adult Pop Airplay (Billboard)	37
US Hot Rock & Alternative Songs (Billboard)	1

=== Year-end charts ===
Chart (2011)	Position
US Hot Rock & Alternative Songs (Billboard)	18
Chart (2012)	Position
US Hot Rock & Alternative Songs (Billboard)	15

=== Decade-end charts ===
Chart (2010–2019)	Position
US Hot Rock Songs (Billboard)	43
