= Wanderlust (Gavin Rossdale album) =

Studio album by Gavin Rossdale
- Released: June 3, 2008
- Recorded: 2007–2008
- Genre: Rock
- Length: 53:40
- Label: Interscope
- Producer: Bob Rock

Singles from Wanderlust
- 1. "Love Remains the Same" Released: May 2008; 2. "Forever May You Run" Released: April 2009

Wanderlust (stylized as WANDERlust) is the debut solo album by Bush frontman Gavin Rossdale. It is his first studio album since Institute's Distort Yourself in 2005. Rossdale's initial working title for the record was This Place is on Fire, now the moniker for the release's a cappella coda piece. The lead single, "Love Remains the Same," was released digitally on April 1, 2008.

The album was produced by Bob Rock and finds Rossdale collaborating with drummer Josh Freese, former Helmet member and Bush tour guitarist Chris Traynor, bass player Paul Bushnell and Jamie Muhoberac on keyboards, as well as David A. Stewart of Eurythmics fame, Linda Perry, Joel Shearer, Katy Perry and Garbage singer Shirley Manson.

The song "Can't Stop the World" was originally written and recorded for the short-lived TV series Drive. The song is also known by the alternate title "Some Days," but the finalized Wanderlust artwork has it listed as "Can't Stop the World."

== Critical reception ==
Professional ratings
Aggregate scores
Source	Rating
Metacritic	(48/100)
Review scores
Source	Rating
411Mania	6.8/10
AllMusic	2.5/5 stars
Blender	2/5 stars
Entertainment Weekly	B−
Lost At Sea	(4/10)
Los Angeles Times	3/4 stars
PopMatters	3/10 stars
Rolling Stone	2/5 stars
TuneLab	5.5/10

Wanderlust received generally mixed reviews from music critics. At Metacritic, which assigns a normalized rating out of 100 to reviews from mainstream critics, the album received an average score of 48, based on 7 reviews.

Mikael Wood, writing for the Los Angeles Times, found nothing groundbreaking in the album's musicianship but gave note of Rossdale's writing giving off "a whiff of universality" along with "an appealing guilelessness" saying that "Iffy lyrics aside, Wanderlust finds Rossdale circling back to the heavy pop he does best." Brian Orloff from Entertainment Weekly called the record "at its best, a bright collection of Daughtry-esque rock boasting anthems" but that it falters when delving into "saccharine sentiments."

AllMusic senior editor Stephen Thomas Erlewine said that Rossdale's charismatic vocals work well in the album's field of MOR-style rock but concluded that "this is still deliberately tepid music, more concerned about appearances than hooks or drama." Rolling Stone's Jody Rosen felt that Rossdale was ill-suited on the power ballads and worked best in grunge where he delivered lyrically thought-provoking material but said that it was "a goal that exceeds his gifts as a songwriter."

Rob Sheffield from Blender panned the album's tracks for coming across more like "a mealy-mouthed, cliché-ridden, bombastic Chris Cornell solo joint", and the use of Auto-Tune on Rossdale's vocals. Michael Roffman of Consequence of Sound criticized the record for containing "double vocal tracks" and "Nickelback-like singalongs" that added to Rossdale's digital layered performance and lazy lyricism.

== Track listing ==
All lyrics are written by Gavin Rossdale.

No.	Title	Music	Length
1.	"Can't Stop the World"	Rossdale	4:09
2.	"Frontline"	Rossdale; Bob Rock	3:44
3.	"Forever May You Run"	Rossdale; Linda Perry	4:59
4.	"The Skin I'm In"	Rossdale	3:53
5.	"Drive"	Rossdale; Marti Frederiksen	3:45
6.	"Future World"	Rossdale; Dave Stewart	4:56
7.	"Love Remains the Same"	Rossdale; Frederiksen	4:09
8.	"If You're Not With Us You Are Against Us"	Rossdale	4:48
9.	"This Is Happiness"	Rossdale	4:34
10.	"Another Night In the Hills"	Rossdale; Stewart	3:04
11.	"The Trouble I'm In"	Rossdale	4:55
12.	"Beauty In the Beast"	Rossdale; Stewart	5:37
13.	"This Place Is On Fire" (hidden track)	Rossdale	1:02
Total length:			53:40

=== Bonus tracks ===
No.	Title	Music	Length
14.	"I Don't Want to Lose Myself Tonight"	Rossdale; Frederiksen	3:40
15.	"You Can't Run from What You Forget"	Rossdale	3:37

=== 2013 Edel Records re-release ===
No.	Title	Music	Length
13.	"Jungle in the Circus" (B-side on "Love Remains the Same" single)	Rossdale	4:16
14.	"I Don't Want to Lose Myself Tonight"	Rossdale; Frederiksen	3:40
15.	"You Can't Run from What You Forget"	Rossdale	3:37
16.	"Vaya Con Dios" (B-side on "Love Remains the Same" single)	Rossdale	3:54
17.	"This Place Is On Fire" (hidden track)	Rossdale	1:02
Total length:			69:27

== Chart positions ==
Chart (2008)	Peak position
US Billboard 200	33
US Top Rock Albums (Billboard)	12
US Top Alternative Albums (Billboard)	8
Germany Albums Top 100	64
Austrian Albums Chart	40
Switzerland Albums Top 100	95

== Personnel ==
- Gavin Rossdale – lead vocals, guitar
- Chris Traynor – guitar
- Paul Bushnell – bass
- Jamie Muhoberac – keyboards
- Josh Freese – drums
- Gwen Stefani – backing vocals on "Can't Stop the World"
- Shirley Manson – backing vocals on "The Trouble I'm In"
- Katy Perry – backing vocals on "Another Night in the Hills"
- Toiya Barnes – backing vocals
- Esther Austin – backing vocals
- Angie Fisher – backing vocals
