= Baby Come Home =

Baby Come Home may refer to:

- "Baby Come Home" (Bush song), 2012
- "Baby Come Home" (Scissor Sisters song), 2012

== See also ==
- "Baby Come On Home", a 1993 Led Zeppelin song
