= Afterlife (Bush song) =

Single by Bush

from the album The Sea of Memories
- Released: June 2010
- Genre: Alternative rock
- Length: 4:45 (Album version); 4:01 (Radio edit)
- Label: Interscope
- Songwriter: Gavin Rossdale
- Producer: Bob Rock

Bush singles chronology
| "Inflatable" (2002) | "Afterlife" (2010) | "The Sound of Winter" (2011) |

"Afterlife" is a song by British band Bush from their fifth album The Sea of Memories. It was released as a promo single in June 2010. It was re-released to radio stations as the album's third official single in July 2012.

== Music video ==
A lyric video was uploaded on Bush's official YouTube account to promote the single. The video shows the band performing on stage while transitioning to Gavin singing with images depicting the lyrics.

== Charts ==
| Chart (2010) | Peak position |
|---|---|
| Canada Rock (Billboard) | 31 |
| US Hot Rock & Alternative Songs (Billboard) | 29 |
