= Tragic (album) =

Studio album by Orange 9mm
- Released: July 23, 1996
- Recorded: February – March 1996
- Studio: Excello, New York City; Magic Shop, New York City; Chung King Studios, New York City
- Genre: Rap metal; alternative metal; funk metal
- Length: 35:47
- Label: Atlantic
- Producer: Dave Sardy

Orange 9mm chronology
Driver Not Included (1995)	Tragic (1996)	Ultraman vs. Godzilla (1998)

Tragic is the second studio album by the American rock band Orange 9mm. Produced by Dave Sardy of Barkmarket, it was released on July 23, 1996, through Atlantic Records. Guitarist Chris Traynor recorded most of the bass parts, replacing David Gentile, who was replaced by Taylor McLam near the end of the recording sessions. Traynor departed not long after the album's release, ending up joining Helmet.

Tragic is a departure from Driver Not Included's hardcore stylings in favor of a rap metal sound akin to Rage Against the Machine and Red Hot Chili Peppers, featuring acoustic and alternative metal tracks.

== Critical reception ==
Professional ratings
Review scores
Source	Rating
AllMusic	3/5 stars
Collector's Guide to Heavy Metal	4/10

AllMusic critic Vincent Jeffries wrote: "The thick instrumentation and fat grooves deliver on every promise made during Orange 9mm's famously powerful live performances, but the adherence to of-the-moment metal sonics prevent Tragic from transcending its time." Jefferies further added that the album "remains a solid offering for fans of a small but important '90s metal movement."

== Track listing ==
All tracks are written by Orange 9mm.

1. "Fire in the Hole" – 3:16
2. "Tragic" – 2:58
3. "Seven" – 3:29
4. "Gun to Your Head" – 3:40
5. "Stick Shift" – 1:02
6. "Dead in the Water" – 4:03
7. "Method" – 3:21
8. "Crowd Control" – 0:57
9. "Muted" – 4:28
10. "Take You Away" – 2:51
11. "Failure" – 3:00
12. "Feel It" – 2:54
13. "Kiss It Goodbye" – 4:09

== Personnel ==
Orange 9mm

- Chaka Malik – vocals, percussion
- Matthew Cross – drums, percussion
- Taylor McLam – bass
- Chris Traynor – guitars, bass

Additional

- Dave Sardy – engineer, mixing, producer
- Greg Gordon – engineer, mixing
- Joe Warda – second engineer
- Rob Eberhardt – computer imaging
- Frank Gargiulo – art direction, design
- Mike Gitter – A&R
- Stephen Marcussen – mastering
- Doug Henderson – engineer (track 11)
- Steve Thompson – mixing (track 11)
