= Cub Country =

Solo indie rock project

- Origin: Brooklyn, NY, United States
- Genres: Indie rock
- Years active: 2000–2014
- Labels: Future Farmer
- Members: Jeremy Chatelain; Trever Hadley; Brent Dreiling; Matt Montaigue; Kathryne Youkstetter; Wim Becker
- Website: MySpace Page

Cub Country is a solo indie rock project created by Jets To Brazil bassist Jeremy Chatelain. Throughout its history Cub Country has been a collaborative effort involving a huge assortment of musicians, various record labels and located in various regions of the United States.

== Early group history ==
Cub Country began in 1998 when Chatelain began writing material in an alt-country style that didn't quite suit the sound of Jets To Brazil. At first, the idea for Cub Country was to be more along the lines of a solo project for Chatelain than an actual band. In 2000 "Ultra Slim vs. Cub Country" was released through the Ear To Ground label followed by "High Uinta High" which was released through Jade Tree Records. On the latter album, Chatelain recruited Cashe Tolman of Rival Schools, Chris Traynor of Helmet, Nick Macri of Euphone and Theo Kogan of Lunachicks.

== Later work ==
Between 2002 and 2004 Chatelain worked on "Stay Poor. Stay Happy", which was finally released on 28 September 2004, on the Future Farmer label. He was joined on the album by guitarist Jeff Clarke, drummer Justin Ansley and The Comas bassist Matt Sumrow. In 2009, "Stretch That Skull Cover And Smile" was released on Future Farmer Recordings. In 2014 the band self-released their fourth and final LP, "Repeat Until Death." The album was released on vinyl with help from a Kickstarter campaign.

== Discography ==
- High Uinta High – 2002 (Jade Tree)
- Stay Poor Stay Happy – 2004 (Future Farmer)
- Stretch That Skull Cover and Smile – 2009 (Future Farmer)
- Repeat Until Death – 2014 (Self-released)
