= Pretend I'm Human =

Studio album by Orange 9mm
- Released: July 13, 1999
- Recorded: March–April 1999
- Studio: Mad Dog (Burbank, California)
- Length: 42:37
- Label: Ng
- Producer: Neil Perry

Orange 9mm chronology
Ultraman Vs. Godzilla (1998)	Pretend I'm Human (1999)

Pretend I'm Human is the third and final album by the American band Orange 9mm, released on July 13, 1999. It was a commercial disappointment. Pretend I'm Human was rereleased in 2021.

The band supported it by playing the 1999 Warped Tour; they also toured with Machine Head.

== Production ==
Recorded in California, Pretend I'm Human was produced by Neil Perry. The band abandoned all of its demoed songs once they were in the studio, opting instead to start over. Vocalist Chaka Malik played bass on the album. The lyrics to many of the songs touch on themes of societal power dynamics and class.

== Critical reception ==
Professional ratings
Review scores
Source	Rating
AllMusic	2.5/5 stars
Collector's Guide to Heavy Metal	6/10
In Music We Trust	B−
PopMatters	8.5/10
See Magazine	3.5/5 stars
Winnipeg Sun	3.5/5 stars

Exclaim! wrote that "Touching Skies" "may be the best, if not the only, rap-metal power ballad ever." The Telegram & Gazette deemed the album the band's best yet, praising the "rap-inspired grooves, sharper dynamic shifts and overall better chops." The Arizona Daily Star determined that Malik's "words are racy enough to turn a sailor incarnadine, yet his rap is fantastically caustic poetry."

The New York Post noted that Orange 9mm "is still their hard-core selves on this 10-song collection, which taps hip-hop, industrial and good old-fashioned Stairway-to-Hell metal." The Winnipeg Sun concluded that the "NYC trio manages to weld heavy riffs and hip-hop rhythms without getting them all over each other." The San Diego Union-Tribune stated that "the lurching guitars in the Fugazi-like 'Lifeless', the explosive title track and even the slow build-up in 'Touching Skies', a rather preachy song about self-determination, have a raw, punk edge to them that you won't find in other so-called new metal bands."

AllMusic wrote that, "even if Malik has a better lyrical flow than most rap-metal singers, the results tend to sound stiff and forced when there are no funky backing rhythms for him to play off of." In 2021, Decibel called Pretend I'm Human "extraordinarily eclectic," noting that the reissue "brings the guitars to the fore [to] make it a perfect ahead-of-its-time candidate for reevaluation."

== Track listing ==
No.	Title	Length
1.	"When You Lie"	3:01
2.	"Lifeless"	3:41
3.	"Facelift"	4:11
4.	"Touching Skies"	4:57
5.	"Pretend I'm Human"	3:48
6.	"Dragons (You Know I Love You)"	5:33
7.	"Innocence"	7:01
8.	"Alien"	3:30
9.	"Tightrope"	5:11
10.	"Day One"	1:44
Total length:		42:37

== Personnel ==
Orange 9mm

- Chaka Malik – vocals
- Taylor McLam – guitars, bass
- Matthew Cross – drums

Additional

- Sacha Jenkins – backing vocals
- Neil Perry – producer, engineer, mixing, keyboards, programming
- Rafael Serrano – engineer
- Howie Weinberg – mastering
