= Forever May You Run =

Single by Gavin Rossdale

from the album Wanderlust
- Released: April 19, 2009 (U.S.)
- Recorded: 2007–2008
- Length: 4:59
- Label: Interscope
- Songwriters: G. Rossdale; Linda Perry
- Producer: Bob Rock

Gavin Rossdale singles chronology
"Love Remains the Same" (2008)	"Forever May You Run" (2009)

"Forever May You Run" is the second single from Gavin Rossdale's 2008 album Wanderlust. The single was released in April 2009, almost one year after Rossdale's previous single, "Love Remains the Same", which was released in May 2008.

Gavin performed his new single live at The Ellen DeGeneres Show on 21 March 2009. A music video for the song was released on 28 April 2009. Gavin's first son (Kingston) cameos in the video at 2:23.

== Charts ==
Chart (2009)	Peak position
U.S. Billboard Adult Pop Songs	32
