= Baby Come Home (Bush song) =

Single by Bush

from the album The Sea of Memories
- Released: 17 January 2012
- Length: 4:15
- Label: Zuma Rock
- Songwriter: Gavin Rossdale
- Producer: Bob Rock

Bush singles chronology
"The Sound of Winter" (2011)	"Baby Come Home" (2012)	"Glycerine (Live)" (2012)

"Baby Come Home" is a 2012 song by British post-grunge band Bush from their fifth album The Sea of Memories. It was released as the third single on 17 January 2012.

== Music video ==
The music video was directed by Gavin Rossdale's brother-in-law Todd Stefani. It is available on Bush's VEVO account.

== Charts ==
=== Weekly charts ===
Chart (2012)	Peak position
Canada Rock (Billboard)	33
US Hot Rock & Alternative Songs (Billboard)	25

=== Year-end charts ===
Chart (2012)	Position
US Hot Rock & Alternative Songs (Billboard)	85
