= Driver Not Included =

Studio album by Orange 9mm
- Released: February 14, 1995
- Recorded: 1994
- Studio: El Dorado Studios (Los Angeles, California); Right Track Studios (New York City, New York)
- Genre: Hardcore punk; alternative metal
- Length: 38:14
- Label: EastWest
- Producer: Dave Jerden

Orange 9mm chronology
Orange 9mm EP (1994)	Driver Not Included (1995)	Tragic (1996)

Driver Not Included is the debut studio album by American rock band Orange 9mm. It was released on February 14, 1995, through EastWest Records. Considered as a landmark release in 1990's New York hardcore scene, the album incorporates influences from funk and heavy metal. The band supported the album by touring with Ned's Atomic Dustbin.

== Critical reception ==
Professional ratings
Review scores
Source	Rating
AllMusic	4/5 stars

AllMusic critic Jason Anderson described the album as "a very strong effort," further stating: "This 1995 Elektra release deserves its own place among the list of important '90s aggro/punk/hardcore releases."

== Track listing ==
All tracks are written by Orange 9mm, except where noted.

1. "Glistening" – 2:32
2. "High Speed Changer" – 2:53
3. "Disclaimer" – 2:34
4. "Suspect" – 3:57
5. "Pissed" – 3:04
6. "Toilet" – 2:19
7. "Magnet" – 3:09
8. "Guyatone" – 3:35
9. "Thickest Glass" – 3:02
10. "Can't Decide" – 3:15
11. "Sacrifice" – 4:27
12. "Cutting and Draining" – 3:27

== Personnel ==
Orange 9mm

- Chaka Malik – vocals
- Chris Traynor – guitar
- Davide Gentile – bass
- Matthew Cross – drums

Additional

- Mike Bloom – photography
- Bryan Carlstrom – engineer
- Annette Cisneros – assistant engineer
- Matthew Curry – assistant engineer
- Nick DiDia – mixing
- Jim Evans – art direction
- Don Fury – mixing
- Dave Jerden – mixing, producer
- George Marino – mastering
- Tim Owen – photography

== Charts ==
Chart (1995)	Peak position
US Heatseekers Albums (Billboard)	17
