= See You Dead =

Single by Helmet

from the album Size Matters
- Released: August 2004
- Recorded: March – June 2004
- Studio: Cello Studios in Hollywood, California
- Genre: Alternative metal
- Length: 3:48
- Label: Interscope
- Songwriter: Page Hamilton
- Producers: Charlie Clouser, Jay Baumgardner, Ted Jensen

Helmet singles chronology
"Like I Care" (1997)	"See You Dead" (2004)	"Unwound" (2004)

"See You Dead" is a song by American alternative metal band Helmet. The song was released in 2004 as the first single from the band's fifth album, Size Matters. It was the band's first single since reforming and their first in nearly seven years.

== Reception and legacy ==
Blabbermouth.net referred to the song as a pop-inflected, airplay-friendly number that bears more resemblance to the generic rock you hear on your modern rock radio outlet than the crushing Helmet of yore." Pitchfork reviewer David Raposa negatively compared "See You Dead" to the Burning Airlines song "Wheaton Calling."

In 2017, Norma Jean vocalist Cory Brandon selected "See You Dead" as one of his favorite Helmet songs. In 2019, Dan Slessor of Kerrang!, in a retrospective of the band's entire discography up to that point, selected the song as one of the best on the album (along with "Everybody Loves You" and "Unwound"), calling it "among the most melodic and catchiest songs of their career."

== Track listing ==
No.	Title	Length
1.	"See You Dead"	3:48

== Chart positions ==
Chart	Peak position
US Mainstream Rock Tracks (Billboard)	29

== Personnel ==
- Page Hamilton – vocals, guitar
- Chris Traynor – bass
- John Tempesta – drums
