= Love Remains the Same (song) =

Single by Gavin Rossdale

from the album Wanderlust
- Released: May 1, 2008 (U.S.)
- Genre: Soft rock
- Length: 4:09
- Label: Interscope
- Songwriters: G. Rossdale; M. Frederiksen
- Producer: Bob Rock

Gavin Rossdale singles chronology
| "Adrenaline" (2002) | "Love Remains the Same" (2008) | "Forever May You Run" (2009) |

"Love Remains the Same" is a song by British artist Gavin Rossdale. It was released in May 2008 as the lead single from his album Wanderlust. It entered the Billboard Hot 100 at number 76 and peaked at number 27. It unexpectedly became Rossdale's first top-40 hit in the United States since 1995 when his former band Bush scored hits with "Comedown" and "Glycerine". It has since become more successful than Rossdale's biggest hits with Bush from the mid-1990s and is now his most successful track.

== Track list ==
CD German single (0602517733183)

1. "Love Remains the Same"
2. "Jungle in the Circus"
3. "Vaya Con Dios"
4. "Love Remains the Same" (video)

== Charts ==
=== Weekly charts ===
| Chart (2008–2009) | Peak position |
|---|---|
| Austria (Ö3 Austria Top 40) | 24 |
| Canada Hot 100 (Billboard) | 28 |
| Germany (GfK) | 52 |
| Switzerland (Schweizer Hitparade) | 71 |
| US Adult Contemporary (Billboard) | 6 |
| US Adult Pop Airplay (Billboard) | 2 |
| US Alternative Airplay (Billboard) | 33 |
| US Billboard Hot 100 | 27 |
| US Pop Airplay (Billboard) | 20 |

=== Year-end charts ===
| Chart (2008) | Position |
|---|---|
| US Billboard Hot 100 | 94 |
| US Adult Top 40 (Billboard) | 11 |
| Chart (2009) | Position |
| US Adult Contemporary (Billboard) | 8 |
| US Adult Top 40 (Billboard) | 32 |

== Release history ==
Release dates and formats for "Love Remains the Same"
| Region | Date | Format | Label(s) | Ref. |
|---|---|---|---|---|
| United States | June 10, 2008 | Mainstream airplay | Interscope | |
