= Chris Vitali =

American musician (born 1974)

Chris Vitali (born 1974) is an American musician. Known for his animated and energetic style of playing the bass guitar, Vitali has played in numerous bands in the New York City rock scene since 1990. Most notably, he was the bassist for New York City's prolific hard rock act Orange 9mm from 1995-1999. His other projects have included Hermaphrochrist, Burn, Head Assembly, and The Fuzz (not to be confused with the 1970s musical act The Fuzz).

Vitali also has many studio credits to his name, most recently working with ex-Flaw singer Chris Volz on his new solo album.
