= The Sea of Memories =

2011 studio album by Bush

Studio album by Bush
- Released: 13 September 2011
- Recorded: June 2010 – June 2011; Los Angeles, California
- Genres: Alternative rock, post-grunge
- Length: 49:15
- Labels: Zuma Rock; eOne; earMUSIC
- Producer: Bob Rock

Bush chronology
Zen X Four (2005)	The Sea of Memories (2011)	Man on the Run (2014)

Singles from The Sea of Memories
- 1. "Afterlife" Released: June 2010; 2. "The Sound of Winter" Released: 22 July 2011; 3. "Baby Come Home" Released: 17 January 2012

The Sea of Memories is the fifth studio album by English alternative rock band Bush, released on 13 September 2011 through Zuma Rock Records, eOne Music and earMUSIC. It is the band's first studio album in ten years, following 2001's Golden State, and the first to be recorded with Chris Traynor and Corey Britz on lead guitar and bass, respectively. It is also the first Bush album released on E1 Records, marking their first venture away from Interscope (or Atlantic), who handled all of their previous releases. The album's title comes from a line in the song "Baby Come Home". The cover art is by Los Angeles–based street artist RETNA.

== Background and production ==
Originally intended for an autumn 2010 release, the working title for this album was Everything Always Now. The Sea of Memories was produced by Bob Rock. The album took more than a year to materialise with pre-production beginning in June 2010 and recording sessions wrapping up a year later.

== Promotion ==
In an exclusive partnership with Electronic Arts, the band announced that they were offering a free download of "All My Life", which was made available on the video games' website. Another song by the band was set to be featured on the soundtrack to NHL 12; it was released on 25 July 2011 as another exclusive free download, "The Sound of Winter", but was also made available for download from the US iTunes.

The band appeared on Jimmy Kimmel Live! on 21 July, performing "The Sound of Winter" to promote the album. The band also performed the song on The Tonight Show with Jay Leno on 22 September and Discovery Channel's American Chopper Live on 6 December 2011. Their Chopper appearance marked the series' second highest rated episode to date.

Many of the songs from The Sea of Memories are on the soundtrack for Ski Channel film tour film Winter, starring Ted Ligety, Simon Dumont, Sean Pettit, Sarah Burke and numerous other action sport stars. "The Sound of Winter" is the title track for the film, which was directed by the founder of the Tennis Channel Steve Bellamy.

In January 2012 the band released the album's third single, "Baby Come Home". To promote the single the band appeared again on The Tonight Show with Jay Leno to perform the song on 2 February 2012.

== Release and reception ==
=== Commercial performance ===
The album's lead single, "The Afterlife", originally released in June 2010, reached the top 40 on both the Hot Mainstream Rock Tracks (#34) and Alternative Songs (#22). The album's second single, "The Sound of Winter", released more than a year later in July 2011, fared better on the charts in North America, reaching the top ten on both the US Active Rock chart (#4) and the Hot Mainstream Rock Tracks (#3). The song topped the Alternative Songs on 18 October, becoming the first self-released single by an artist to reach number one on the chart, and later topped the Rock Songs chart, becoming the band's first number one single on the chart. In Canada the song also had good success, reaching #2 the Canadian Alternative Chart, number four on the Active Rock Chart and number 97 on the Canadian Hot 100. Released on 13 September 2011, The Sea of Memories sold 20,000 copies in the United States in its first week of release to land at number 18 on the Billboard 200 chart. The album peaked at number 18 on the Billboard 200, number 20 on the Top Digital Albums, number five on the Top Independent Albums and the Top Modern Rock/Alternative Albums and number eight on the Top Rock Albums.

=== Critical reception ===
Professional ratings
Aggregate scores
Source	Rating
Metacritic	51/100
Review scores
Source	Rating
AllMusic	2.5/5 stars
The A.V. Club	C−
Consequence of Sound	2.5/5 stars
Entertainment Weekly	C−
IGN	(7/10)
PopMatters	5/10 stars
Rolling Stone	3/5 stars
Rockfreaks.net	8/10 stars
Spin	(5/10)
Uncut	2/5 stars

The Sea of Memories received mixed reviews from music critics. At Metacritic, where they assign a "weighted average" rating out of 100 to selected independent ratings and reviews from mainstream critics, the album received a score of a 51, based on 10 reviews, indicating "Mixed or average reviews." Stephen Thomas Erlewine of AllMusic gave the album 2 and a half out of 5 stars, stating, "The Sea of Memories is easily the most enjoyable collection of songs released under Bush's name." Rockfreaks.net praised the album and the tracks "The Sound of Winter", "She's a Stallion" and "Stand Up", stating, "'The Sea of Memories' is every bit as good as classic Bush." IGN gave the album 7 out of 10, stating, "Ultimately, Bush's return is far from perfect, but still proves to be a welcome return." Love-It-Loud.com gave a positive review, saying: "Whether the songs edge towards the old Bush alternative rock style or go for more of a pop-rock approach, they remain catchy and full of hooks, with Rossdale’s voice at the forefront, as strong as ever."

Many reviews were mostly mixed or negative, however. Kyle Anderson of Entertainment Weekly said that the album "adds exactly zero entries to the totally awesome Bush greatest-hits album that doesn't exist yet." Steven Hyden of The A.V. Club said that the album "plays like an endless replay of Rossdale's past musical miscues." Kevin Barber of Consequence of Sound said in an average review, "What The Sea of Memories does is inject some life into the Bush brand, proving that Rossdale isn't ready to call it a day." Enio Chiola of PopMatters said that the album "will most likely please those few Bush fans who've been hoping for a reunion, but it will not change the minds of those who relegated Bush to nothing more than a disingenuous rip-off of so many more brilliant '90s alterna-rock acts." Mikael Wood of Spin praised "The Afterlife" as a "big-chorused rocker", but added, "As for the ballads, you're better off YouTubing 'Glycerine' – or one of the tearjerkers ('Forever May You Run') from Rossdale's underappreciated 2008 solo disc." Kerrang! gave the album a negative review and said of it, "As far as comebacks go, sadly, this is not a good one." Uncut also gave it two stars out of five and said, "Bob Rock's big production ladles on the reverb, merely emphasizing hollowness at the core."

== Track listing ==
All songs written by Gavin Rossdale, except where noted

No.	Title	Length
1.	"The Mirror of the Signs"	4:19
2.	"The Sound of Winter"	3:28
3.	"All My Life"	3:22
4.	"The Afterlife"	4:45
5.	"All Night Doctors"	4:17
6.	"Baby Come Home"	4:15
7.	"Red Light"	3:31
8.	"She's a Stallion"	4:36
9.	"I Believe in You"	3:11
10.	"Stand Up"	4:19
11.	"The Heart of the Matter"	4:22
12.	"Be Still My Love"	4:48
Total length:		49:15

Target bonus disc
No.	Title	Length
1.	"The Year of Danger"	4:37
2.	"Ghost"	4:54
3.	"Lay Down Your Guns"	4:12
4.	"The Sound of Winter" (Junior Sanchez Remix)	6:22
5.	"The Afterlife" (Remix by Washroom & Bass Over Babylon, Featuring Cecile)	5:03
6.	"All Night Doctors" (Remix by Renholdër)	4:13

UK bonus disc
No.	Title	Writer(s)	Length
1.	"The Year of Danger"		4:37
2.	"Ghost"		4:54
3.	"Lay Down Your Guns"		4:12
4.	"The Sound of Winter" (Junior Sanchez Remix)		6:22
5.	"The Afterlife" (Remix by Washroom & Bass Over Babylon, Featuring Cecile)		5:03
6.	"All Night Doctors" (original version)		4:13
7.	"Landslide" (Live from Bridge School Benefit)	Stevie Nicks	4:21
8.	"Float" (Acoustic Version)		4:12

Wal-Mart & Japan bonus tracks
No.	Title	Writer(s)	Length
13.	"Love Will Tear Us Apart"	Ian Curtis; Peter Hook; Stephen Morris; Bernard Sumner	3:19
14.	"Comedown" (Acoustic Version)		4:21
15.	"Little Things" (Acoustic Version)		4:12

iTunes bonus tracks
No.	Title	Writer(s)	Length
13.	"All Night Doctors" (Original Version)		4:37
14.	"Float" (Acoustic Version)		4:12
15.	"Landslide" (Live from Bridge School Benefit)	Nicks	4:21

15th anniversary edition bonus disc and lp
No.	Title	Writer(s)	Length
1.	"Love Will Tear Us Apart"	Curtis; Hook; Morris; Sumner	3:19
2.	"The Year of Danger"		4:37
3.	"Ghost"		4:54
4.	"Lay Down Your Guns"		4:12
5.	"The Sound of Winter" (Junior Sanchez Remix)		6:22
6.	"The Afterlife" (Remix by Washroom & Bass Over Babylon, Featuring Cecile)		5:03
7.	"All Night Doctors" (Original Version)		4:13
8.	"Landslide" (Live from Bridge School Benefit)	Nicks	4:21
9.	"Float" (Acoustic Version)		4:12

== Personnel ==
Bush

- Gavin Rossdale – lead vocals, rhythm guitar
- Chris Traynor – lead guitar
- Corey Britz – bass, backing vocals
- Robin Goodridge – drums

Additional musicians

- Jamie Muhoberac – keyboards

Technical personnel

- Jay Baumgardner – mixing
- John Ewing, Jr. – engineer, mixing
- Davis Factor – photography
- Matty Green – assistant
- Eric Helmkamp – engineer
- Ted Jensen – mastering
- Michael Moses – publicity
- Julian Peploe – artwork
- Nicole Perna – publicity
- Bob Rock – production
- Mark "Spike" Stent – mixing

== Chart performance ==
Album

Chart (2011)	Peak position
Austrian Albums (Ö3 Austria)	43
Canadian Albums (Billboard)	49
German Albums (Offizielle Top 100)	29
Swiss Albums (Schweizer Hitparade)	48
UK Albums (Official Charts)	200
US Billboard 200	18
US Digital Albums (Billboard)	20
US Independent Albums (Billboard)	5
US Top Alternative Albums (Billboard)	5
US Top Rock Albums (Billboard)	8

Singles

Single	Chart	Peak position	Year
"The Sound of Winter"	Mainstream Rock Tracks	3	2011
"The Sound of Winter"	Alternative Songs	1	2011
"The Sound of Winter"	US Active Rock	4	2011
"The Sound of Winter"	Rock Songs	1	2011
"The Sound of Winter"	US Bubbling Under Hot 100 Singles	4	2011
"The Sound of Winter"	Canadian Alternative Chart	2	2011
"The Sound of Winter"	Canadian Active Rock Chart	4	2011
"The Afterlife"	Mainstream Rock Tracks	34	2010
"The Afterlife"	Alternative Songs	22	2010
