= Institute (band) =

American rock band

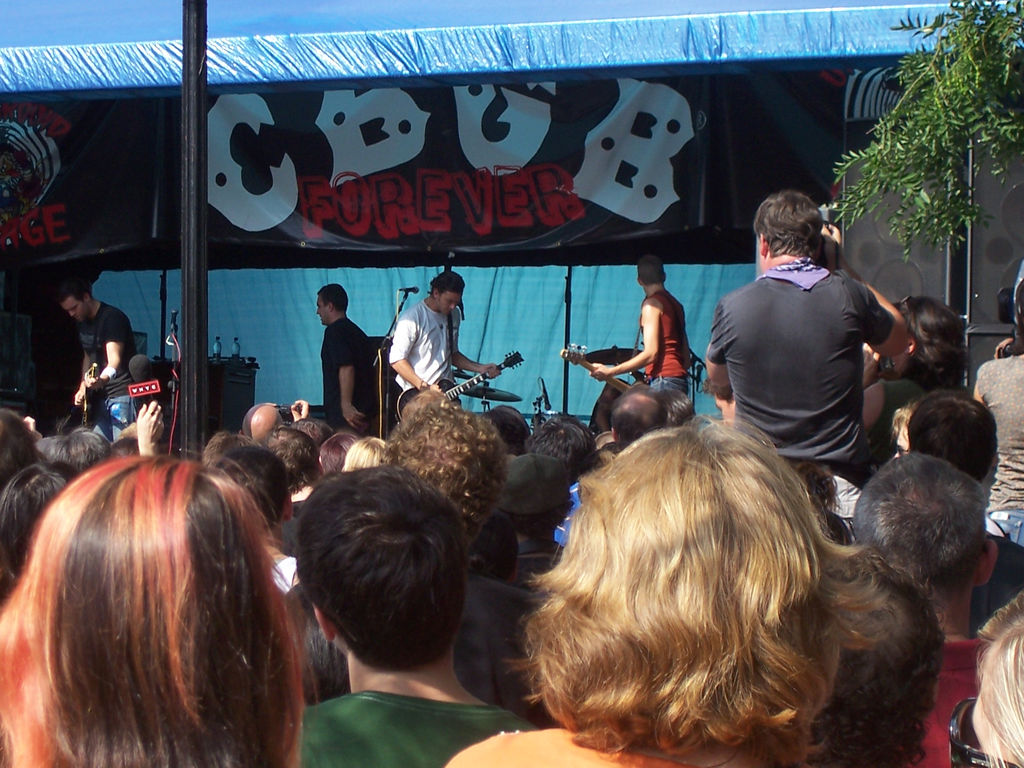
- Institute in 2005

Background information
- Origin: United States
- Genres: Hard rock; post-grunge; alternative rock
- Years active: 2004–2006
- Labels: Interscope
- Past members: Gavin Rossdale; Chris Traynor; Cache Tolman; Josh Freese; Charlie Walker
- Website: institutemusic.com

Institute was an American rock band featuring Bush frontman Gavin Rossdale. Their only album, Distort Yourself, was released on September 13, 2005.

== History ==
Institute was formed in 2004 in the wake of a hiatus by lead singer Gavin Rossdale's other band, Bush. Rossdale formed Institute with guitarist Chris Traynor (who had previously played with Bush), adding bassist Cache Tolman (Rival Schools) and drummer Josh Freese. The latter was only enlisted temporarily, as the band needed a drummer for the recording of their first album, Distort Yourself. Rossdale later recruited Charlie Walker (Split Lip, Chamberlain).

After reuniting with Interscope Records, who had released Bush's first three albums, Rossdale started work on Distort Yourself with producer and Helmet frontman, Page Hamilton.

The album was released on September 13, 2005, and debuted at No. 81 on the Billboard Top 200 Album Charts, with first-week sales slightly over 12,000. Its first single, "Bulletproof Skin", reached a peak of No. 28 on the Mainstream Rock Chart and 29 on the Modern Rock Chart.

Institute played numerous Bush songs live, including "Machinehead", "The People that We Love", "Swallowed", an acoustic version of "Comedown", and "Glycerine". They also performed on The Tyra Banks Show with Banks herself, after Rossdale gave her guitar lessons.

In late 2005, Institute opened for U2 on several of their Vertigo Tour dates. As of 2007, there were no plans for Institute to continue activity as a band

== Band members ==
- Gavin Rossdale (vocals, guitar)
- Chris Traynor (guitar)
- Cache Tolman (bass)
- Charlie Walker (drums)

== Discography ==
Studio albums

- Distort Yourself (2005) – US number 81

Singles

Year	Title	Chart positions		Album
Year	Title	US Modern Rock	US Mainstream Rock	Album
2005	"Bullet Proof Skin"	26	26	Distort Yourself
