= Left (Helmet album) =

Studio album by Helmet
- Released: November 10, 2023
- Recorded: 2023
- Genre: Alternative metal
- Length: 31:14
- Label: earMUSIC
- Producers: Page Hamilton; Jim Kaufman; Mark Renk

Helmet chronology
Live and Rare (2021)	Left (2023)

Singles from Left
- 1. "Holiday" Released: August 23, 2023; 2. "Gun Fluf" Released: September 20, 2023; 3. "Big Shot" Released: October 18, 2023

Left is the ninth studio album by the American alternative metal band Helmet, released on November 10, 2023, through earMUSIC. It is the band's first studio album in seven years, since Dead to the World (2016), the longest gap between albums to date.

== Reception ==
Professional ratings
Review scores
Source	Rating
Distorted Sound	8/10
Kerrang!	2/5
Louder Than War	4/5 stars
Metal.de	6/10
Metal Hammer	4/5 stars
Metal Storm	4.5/10
Rock Hard	8/10

Metal Hammer's Stephen Hill wrote "Helmet are still capable of harnessing all the elements that made them such a brilliantly idiosyncratic band three decades ago. Left contains some of the year's most instantaneous, memorable, propulsive yet deceptively complex riffs that serve as a base for everything from wild noise freakouts to some truly unexpected vocal hooks."

Distorted Sound writer Gavin Brown wrote that, "With their line-up stable for over a decade, and their ever-present vocalist/guitarist Page Hamilton sounding as good as ever, the band still have those riffs ever present on Left and the grooves are just as irresistible today as they have been all through the band's history."

== Track listing ==
All songs are written by Page Hamilton and Kyle Stevenson, except where noted.

Left track listing
No.	Title	Writer(s)	Length
1.	"Holiday"		3:22
2.	"Gun Fluf"		3:29
3.	"NYC Tough Guy"		2:34
4.	"Make-Up"		2:48
5.	"Big Shot"		2:43
6.	"Bombastic"		3:11
7.	"Reprise"		1:41
8.	"Dislocated"		3:19
9.	"Tell Me Again"	Page Hamilton	2:43
10.	"Powder Puff"		3:41
11.	"Resolution" (John Coltrane cover)	John Coltrane	1:43
Total length:			31:14

== Personnel ==
Personnel per liner notes.

Helmet

- Dan Beeman – rhythm guitar
- Dave Case – bass guitar
- Page Hamilton – lead guitar, vocals, production
- Kyle Stevenson – drums

Additional musicians

- Ro Rowan – cello
- Paul Cartwright – string arrangements, violin
- Megan Shung – violin
- Zach Dellinger – viola

Technical

- Jim Kaufman – production, mixing, engineering
- Mark Renk – production
- Howie Weinberg – mastering
- Ryan Molder – engineering
- Joe Cincotta – engineering
- Gregg Cash – engineering assistance

Visuals

- Richard DeSilva – artwork, design
