= Seeing Eye Dog =

Studio album by Helmet
- Released: September 7, 2010
- Recorded: 2009–2010
- Studios: Entourage Studios, North Hollywood, California
- Genre: Alternative metal
- Length: 37:41
- Label: Work Song
- Producers: Page Hamilton, Toshi Kasai

Helmet chronology
Monochrome (2006)	Seeing Eye Dog (2010)	Dead to the World (2016)

Seeing Eye Dog is the seventh studio album by the American alternative metal band Helmet, released on September 7, 2010, via Work Song, the label imprint shared by singer/songwriter Joe Henry and Helmet mainman Page Hamilton's manager. It was their first album in four years since the release of Monochrome in 2006.

== Background ==
Asked in a January 2008 interview if there had been any progress when it comes to putting down ideas for the next Helmet album, Hamilton replied: "No. I've been busy working on jazz tunes. I've written four songs since the last tour ended but they're for this movie I'm working on. It has been nice though as I like to clear out the old palette and do other things. Helmet put two albums out in 18 months, Size Matters and Monochrome, so I think the next album has got to wait. I'm planning to sit down and write a couple songs in March but that is assuming I can get on a roll before we head out to Australia. But we probably won't get an album out until the end of the year." In that interview, Hamilton was hoping that he could "do two more albums and that there is also interest on the touring front. But as long as we can go play shows and people come out to them and I feel good about what we're doing, then we'll do it. Realistically, I'm thinking of two more albums after Monochrome as in two years I'll be fifty years old. So I'm thinking will I be capable? It is very physically demanding and people kind of under estimate the energy you have to put out to play this music. And I don't go out to do a half-assed job. So as long as I can maintain that high level and still feel great, I'll think about doing it."

Regarding the musical direction of the album, Hamilton told AOL's Noisecreep in March 2010 that, "It's a cool album. I'm really into it. It's really good. The mastering guy was freaking out. That makes you feel good. You have to take some time to step back from it. I'm the singer, songwriter, guitar player, producer. I do all the backing vocals and all the extra instruments. It's just about putting everything into it and making it great. You can't really worry about what people are going to say ... a lot of people have a musical agenda or a stylistic agenda. 'I like emo.' Well, we're not emo. 'OK fine.' We're not metal. We're not hardcore. It's just Helmet."

== Reception ==
Professional ratings
Aggregate scores
Source	Rating
Metacritic	66/100
Review scores
Source	Rating
AllMusic	2.5/5 stars
Classic Rock	3.5/5 stars
Metal Hammer	7/10
Rock Sound	9/10
Spin	5/10
Sputnikmusic	3.5/5

According to the review aggregator Metacritic, Seeing Eye Dog received "generally favorable reviews" based on a weighted average score of 66 out of 100 from 8 critic scores.

The NewReview gave the album a 3.5 out of 5 and stated "...Helmet still rock, but really haven't been able to recapture the magic of their first three releases. I do have to say that I found Seeing Eye Dog to be better than Aftertaste, Size Matters and Monochrome combined. This album probably won't open any new doors for the band. But just like that old dog that you’ve grown up with, even with all their faults, it sure is nice to still have them by your side."

Pitchfork included Seeing Eye Dog's cover on their "The Worst Album Covers of 2010" list.

== Album variations ==
Seeing Eye Dog was released in five different formats. Every separate edition of the album included a bonus live album recorded on July 8, 2006, in San Francisco at The Warped Tour.

The available formats included:

1. Digital Only (New album plus 1 live album)
2. Two-disc CD (New album plus 1 bonus live album) + digital download
3. Limited Edition Double 180g Vinyl (New album plus 1 live album) + digital download
4. Limited Edition Deluxe (New album and 1 live album on two-disc CD, new album and 1 live album on double 180g Vinyl, custom HELMET USB key with four more live albums, signed package + digital of new album + 1 live album)
5. Super Deluxe: Same as Deluxe but includes gold laminate/tour access component

== Track listing ==
All songs written by Page Hamilton, except where noted.

No.	Title	Writer(s)	Length
1.	"So Long"		3:12
2.	"Seeing Eye Dog"		4:03
3.	"Welcome to Algiers"		4:21
4.	"LA Water"		4:09
5.	"In Person"		3:06
6.	"Morphing"		3:17
7.	"White City"		3:25
8.	"And Your Bird Can Sing"	John Lennon, Paul McCartney	2:14
9.	"Miserable"		3:24
10.	"She's Lost"		6:30

Bonus live disc track listing

Recorded Live in San Francisco at the Warped Tour July 8, 2006

1. "FBLA" – 3:41
2. "See You Dead" – 3:34
3. "Milquetoast" – 4:54
4. "Swallowing Everything" – 3:54
5. "Birth Defect" – 3:12 (Mistakenly listed as "Role Model" on the cd)
6. "On Your Way Down" – 3:54
7. "Unsung" – 3:53
8. "Ironhead" – 3:11
9. "Tic" – 4:56

== Personnel ==
- Page Hamilton – guitar, vocals
- Dan Beeman – guitar
- Chris Traynor – bass on album, guitar on bonus live disc
- Kyle Stevenson – drums
- Jeremy Chatelain – bass on bonus live disc
- Mike Jost – drums on bonus live disc
