= Jeremy Chatelain (bassist) =

American musician

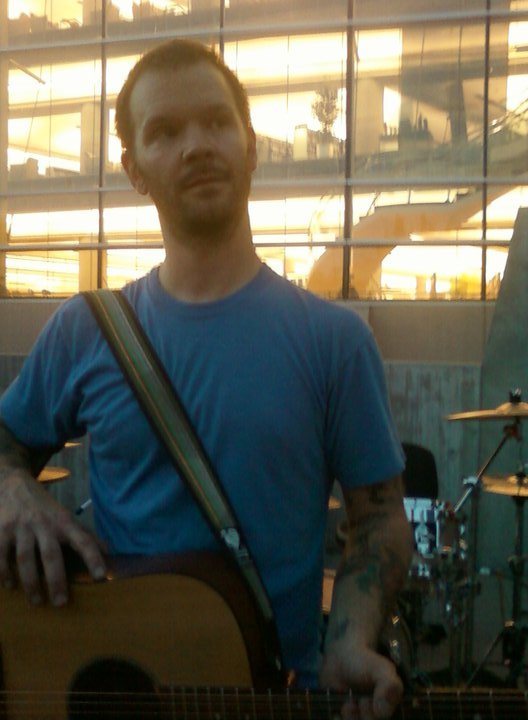
- Chatelain in 2010

Background information
- Also known as: Cub Country
- Origin: New York City, United States
- Genres: Post-hardcore
- Occupation: Musician
- Instrument(s): vocals, bass, guitar

Jeremy Chatelain is a musician originally from Utah. He formed the Utah-based bands Insight and Iceburn, and went on to sing in NYC band Handsome and later formed Jets to Brazil with singer Blake Schwarzenbach. In 2005 Jeremy joined the band Helmet to play bass, but left in September 2006. Since 2000 he has written and performed with Cub Country.

With the band Helmet he replaced Frank Bello on the Size Matters tour. He rejoined the band for the Warped Tour in support of Monochrome; however, he did not appear on the album because of prior commitments while it was being recorded. Chatelain left the band in September 2006, along with fellow members Chris Traynor and Mike Jost.

Prior to joining Helmet, Chatelain was the bassist for Jets to Brazil. He was also the vocalist for Handsome, which included ex-Helmet guitarist Peter Mengede and ex-Quicksand guitarist Tom Capone. Chatelain also played guitar in Salt Lake City's hardcore straight-edge band Insight in the early 1990s and provided vocals for the first 5-member lineup of Iceburn. Both of these early bands released 7-inch recordings on the Victory Records label.

Jeremy also has a collaborative effort, Cub Country. Their album High Uinta High Jade Tree Records was inspired by Salt Lake City (where he grew up) and New York City (where he then resided).
