= Distort Yourself =

Studio album by Institute
- Released: September 13, 2005
- Recorded: 2004–2005
- Genre: Hard rock
- Length: 51:07
- Label: Interscope
- Producer: Gavin Rossdale; Page Hamilton

Singles from Distort Yourself
- 1. "Bullet Proof Skin" Released: 2005

Distort Yourself is the only studio album by American rock band Institute, led by then-former Bush frontman Gavin Rossdale. Released on September 13, 2005, through Interscope Records, the album was co-produced by Helmet frontman Page Hamilton. The album also produced the single "Bulletproof Skin."

== Background and recording ==
Gavin Rossdale stated in 2017 that Distort Yourself was intended to be the fifth Bush album.

== Release and commercial performance ==
The album was released on September 13, 2005, and debuted at #81 on the Billboard Top 200 Album Charts with first week sales slightly over 12,000. Total U.S. sales as of April 2008 were only 54,000 copies.

"Bulletproof Skin" served as the album's single which reached #26 on both the Billboard Mainstream Rock Chart and on the Billboard Modern Rock Chart. It had considerable radio airplay upon release and, in September 2005, was performed live on nearly every late night television program as well as The Tyra Banks Show. The song was featured on the Stealth soundtrack and the video game NHL 06. A music video was also filmed for it, directed by Kevin Kerslake who has done videos for Nirvana and Green Day.

== Critical reception ==
Professional ratings
Review scores
Source	Rating
Allmusic	3/5 stars
The Guardian	2/5 stars
People	3/4 stars
Punknews.org	4/5 stars

The album received mixed reviews from critics. Allmusic's Stephen Thomas Erlewine was positive, stating that the album "sounds livelier than anything he's [Rossdale] done since Razorblade Suitcase." Erlewine also added: "Not that it sounds hip, or even particularly relevant to the sound of 2005, but that doesn't matter – Rossdale is carrying along as if nothing has changed, staying true to his vision, and those who have stuck with him will find Institute a nice revitalization for the ever-earnest post-grunge icon." Punknews.org critic Alex Marriott, who described the record as "an enjoyable effort," thought: "It's about time radio-rock got louder, and this could be the album to do that." Chuck Arnold of People responded positively to the album, writing: "the British rocker is letting his inner head-banger fly with a harder sound than anything he ever did with his old group, and though his musical makeover isn't as wildly triumphant as Stefani's dance-pop reinvention, he makes a solid, credible transformation."

Despite criticizing the album's grunge-indebted sound, Caroline Sullivan of The Guardian wrote: "His tendency toward lachrymose semi-poetry is countered by sharp production and some fairly killer choruses. This will brighten every alt-metaller's Christmas." Contactmusic.com critic Alex Lai thought that "many parts of the record is unimaginative and unspectacular, which is frustrating after a promising beginning." musicOMH's Vik Bansal wrote that the album "may not win a prize for originality, but then again it’s hardly lagging behind most of the opposition where that characteristic is concerned."

== Track listing ==
All songs written by Gavin Rossdale, except where noted.

1. "Bullet-Proof Skin" (Rossdale, Photek) – 4:25
2. "When Animals Attack" – 4:00
3. "Come On Over" – 3:58
4. "Information Age" (Rossdale, Chris Traynor) – 3:42
5. "Wasteland" – 4:18
6. "Boom Box" – 4:36
7. "Seventh Wave" – 4:23
8. "The Heat of Your Love" – 3:33
9. "Ambulances" (feat. Gwen Stefani) – 4:35
10. "Secrets and Lies" – 4:58
11. "Mountains" – 4:05
12. "Save the Robots" – 4:29

=== 2013 reissue with bonus tracks ===
1. "The Buzz Of My System" – 4:24
2. "S.S.T." – 3:24
3. "The Art of Walking" – 3:07
4. "God Gave Us Land" – 3:44

== Personnel ==
- Gavin Rossdale – vocals, guitar
- Chris Traynor – guitar
- Cache Tolman – bass
- Josh Freese – drums
