= Taylor McLam =

Taylor McLam is an American multi-instrumentalist, music composer and record producer. He has composed music for more than 300 advertisements for brands including Verizon, Chrysler, Mitsubishi, Cotton, Visa, Miller Lite, Sears, Lego, McDonald's and Coca-Cola.

In the 1990s, McLam was a member of the band Orange 9mm and contributed his song "Failure" to their 1996 album Tragic, which was released on Atlantic Records. With Orange 9mm, McLam played the Warped Tour in 1995, 1996 and 1997 and toured with bands including The Deftones, The Misfits and Kid Rock.

After parting ways with Orange 9mm, McLam co-wrote the bonus track "Jungle in the Circus" for the 2008 Gavin Rossdale album, Wanderlust, released on Interscope Records. In 2010, McLam scored the independent film Chlorine, directed by Jay Alaimo and starring Kyra Sedgwick and Vincent D'Onofrio. He is also a co-writer of the theme song to the children's show, Pinky Dinky Doo, on the Nick Jr. Channel.

McLam currently serves as Creative Director for Music Beast in New York City.
