= Monochrome (Helmet album) =

Studio album by Helmet
- Released: July 18, 2006
- Recorded: April 17–May 6, 2006
- Studio: Fun City
- Genre: Alternative metal
- Length: 41:04
- Label: Warcon
- Producers: Helmet, Wharton Tiers

Helmet chronology
| Size Matters (2004) | Monochrome (2006) | Seeing Eye Dog (2010) |

Singles from Monochrome
- 1. "Gone" Released: June 2006; 2. "Monochrome" Released: November 2006

Monochrome is the sixth album by the American alternative metal band Helmet, released in 2006 through Warcon. It is the third Helmet album in a row to be recorded as a three-piece, with new drummer Mike Jost joining veterans Page Hamilton and Chris Traynor. Bassist Jeremy Chatelain, who replaced Frank Bello on the Size Matters tour, rejoined the band for the 2006 Warped Tour in support of Monochrome. The album received a mixed reception upon release.

The track 'Monochrome' is featured on the soundtrack for Saw III and is played over the film's end credits; a music video was created which featured Jigsaw's puppet, Billy, lip-syncing the song from inside his dressing room and also while riding his bike. Also featured are shots of frontman Page Hamilton singing the song on distorted television screens as well as some clips from Saw III.

== Background and production ==
The album is said to be a "return to roots", co-produced with Wharton Tiers, who recorded Helmet's first two albums Strap It On and Meantime on the same tape machine used for Monochrome.

"Almost out of Sight" (2006)
30-second sample of the Monochrome track "Almost out of Sight".

Wharton was my only choice to co-produce this project with me. Apart from the sounds he can get in his studio, he was also a major influence in terms of helping me shape my guitar playing.

— Page Hamilton

When asked in an interview if he thought it was a return to roots, Hamilton replied that it was a "return to working with people that I like." At least two of the tracks, "Money Shot" and "Bury Me", are known to be from Hamilton's former band Gandhi, but they have been rerecorded with the new Helmet lineup.

A cover of the song "Requiem" by the band Killing Joke was included on the vinyl release. The CD versions included a code to download the song.

== Release and reception ==
Professional ratings
Aggregate scores
| Source | Rating |
|---|---|
| Metacritic | 52/100 |
Review scores
| Source | Rating |
| AllMusic | 3.5/5 stars |
| Blabbermouth.net | 6/10 |
| Collector's Guide to Heavy Metal | 5/10 |
| Drowned in Sound | 5/10 |
| Pitchfork | 6.3/10 |
| PopMatters | 3/10 |
| The Skinny | 4/5 stars |
| Stylus Magazine | C− |

Monochrome sold 6,000 copies in its first week, a number comparable to the first week sales of the major label-backed Size Matters in 2004. According to the review aggregator Metacritic, Monochrome received "mixed or average reviews" based on a weighted average score of 52 out of 100 from 6 critic scores.

AllMusic's Greg Prato gave Monochrome a positive review, writing "tracks such as 'Brand New' and 'On Your Way Down' could have easily fit on Meantime—while the title track offers some emo-esque melodicism. Monochrome proves once and for all that Hamilton is Helmet's main man." A more negative review came from Stylus Magazine's Cosmo Lee in 2006. He asserts, "Helmet, one of the most influential rock bands of the '90s, has been sliding downhill since 1994's Betty", further adding, "Monochrome finds Helmet with a new label, yet another lineup of hired guns, but press that says the old Helmet is back. Well, it isn't. It can't, because the other original members aren't present. Hamilton always did most of Helmet's songwriting, but the playing chemistry of the old lineup was undeniable." Blabbermouth.net stated in 2006 that, "the new Helmet offering rises or falls squarely on the shoulders of singer, guitarist and creative wellspring Page Hamilton, who has reshuffled the band lineup once again for this sixth studio outing. But the parade of members through this alt-metal quartet doesn't seem to matter much, as it's Hamilton's voice and riffs that dominate the proceedings." They note that producer Wharton Tiers helps to recapture "the proper raw, distorted edge", however, the review also criticizes Hamilton for "treading the same ground he's covered extensively on the band's early records, without adding anything to the mix." In his July 2006 review, Drowned in Sound's Nick Cowen wrote, "the components that make up the bludgeoning sound that Helmet shot to prominence with, have pretty much become commonplace in metal" and that "Hamilton's singing has taken a bit of a nosedive too." However, Cowen still considered Monochrome be an improvement over Size Matters.

== Touring ==
In support of Monochrome' release, Helmet performed at the 2006 Warped Tour. New drummer Mike Jost left Helmet in late 2006, following the completion of the Warped Tour shows, as did rhythm guitarist Chris Traynor. Aside from Hamilton, Traynor was the last remaining member to have been involved in the original run of Helmet, as he had performed on the Aftertaste tour in 1997. For the late 2006 and 2007 shows in support of Monochrome, Traynor was replaced by guitarist Jimmy Thompson (also known as Jimmy Tee), formerly of the Australian alternative metal band Full Scale, while Jost was replaced by Kyle Stevenson, who still remains with Helmet. Regarding the lineup changes, Hamilton explained to Blabbermouth.net in October 2006, "the difficult thing is that, as we get older, people have responsibilities in their lives, and I don't expect them to be there at my beck and call for the salary that I'm able to pay them. It's hard. It's hard. Chris has a daughter. Mike Jost was on the tour, his girlfriend was pregnant. He had to leave halfway through the tour to go have his son. [...] The shit that we went through we went through on the road. And it's part of the stress of being away from home, and being in relationships back home. And everybody goes through it. I can't — I'm at that point in my life where I have a little less stress with my home life, because I'm single. I was once married, and I had a girlfriend for the last three and a half years up until May. I don't have to answer to anybody, and I don't have a son or a daughter either."

== Track listing ==
All tracks by Page Hamilton, except where noted.

| No. | Title | Writer(s) | Length |
|---|---|---|---|
| 1. | "Swallowing Everything" | | 3:54 |
| 2. | "Brand New" | Hamilton, Jost, Traynor | 4:11 |
| 3. | "Bury Me" | | 4:31 |
| 4. | "Monochrome" | | 3:50 |
| 5. | "On Your Way Down" | Hamilton, Jost, Traynor | 4:16 |
| 6. | "Money Shot" | | 3:14 |
| 7. | "Gone" | | 3:31 |
| 8. | "Almost Out of Sight" | | 4:17 |
| 9. | "Howl" (instrumental) | | 1:04 |
| 10. | "410" | | 3:47 |
| 11. | "Goodbye" | | 5:33 |

Vinyl edition bonus track
| No. | Title | Writer(s) | Length |
|---|---|---|---|
| 12. | "Requiem" (Killing Joke cover) | Jaz Coleman, Kevin Walker, Martin Glover, Paul Ferguson | 3:41 |

== Charts ==
| Year | Chart | Position |
|---|---|---|
| 2006 | Billboard 200 | 159 |
| 2006 | Australian Albums (ARIA) | 158 |

== Personnel ==
- Page Hamilton – guitar, vocals
- Chris Traynor – bass
- Mike Jost – drums
