= Size Matters =

Studio album by Helmet
- Released: October 5, 2004
- Recorded: March–June 2004
- Studios: Cello Studios, Hollywood, California
- Genre: Alternative metal
- Length: 39:35
- Label: Interscope
- Producers: Page Hamilton; Charlie Clouser; Jay Baumgardner

Helmet chronology
Unsung: The Best of Helmet (1991–1997) (2004)	Size Matters (2004)	Monochrome (2006)

Promo cover
- Cover of the promo version of the album

Singles from Size Matters
- 1. "See You Dead" Released: August 2004; 2. "Unwound" Released: 2004

Size Matters is the fifth album by the American alternative metal band Helmet, released in 2004 on Interscope Records. It is the first new album since the band ended with a bitter break-up in 1998, and it is also their final album to be released through Interscope.

== Background ==
Page Hamilton, the band's founder and chief songwriter, is the only original member appearing on the album. Therefore, some fans object to it being called "Helmet" and consider it to be a Page Hamilton solo project. According to Hamilton, founding members John Stanier (drums) and Henry Bogdan (bass) both declined the invitation to reunite. Rhythm guitarist Peter Mengede, another founding member, had moved back to his native country of Australia in late 2001. Stanier publicly criticized Hamilton and the new Helmet in 2004, and has not kept in contact with him since their original split.

Despite any objections, the album carries on in the Helmet tradition with Hamilton's trademark staccato sound. Hamilton said to Deseret News in October 2004, "I can see why John is upset. There are some people who feel that only the original lineup can constitute a group. But then there are others who don't care. What I'm more concerned with is the fact that the music is good." He further added, "I'm not trying to pull the wool over anyone's eyes. This is a new Helmet." In 2003, Hamilton had been entertaining offers from two major labels to release a solo album. He only decided to make new music under the Helmet moniker after Interscope founder Jimmy Iovine called him and encouraged him to make another Helmet album. Interscope had released the band's three previous albums in the 1990s.

The album was recorded as a three-piece with ex-White Zombie drummer John Tempesta and Chris Traynor (guitarist on the Aftertaste tour) on bass. After recording was done, Anthrax bassist Frank Bello was brought in so Traynor could return to guitar for live performances. Bello is included in promotional images from the Size Matters era, and several reviewers mistakenly claimed that he performed on the album. Unlike with previous Helmet albums, Size Matters was made with the assistance of digital editing software Pro Tools.

== Composition ==
"Drug Lord" (2004)
30 second sample of the Size Matters track "Drug Lord".

=== Music and lyrics ===
Many of the album's lyrics were inspired by Hamilton's year long relationship with actress Winona Ryder in 2003. Hamilton has since commented that Ryder was a fan of Helmet and that she has heard the album, saying in 2007 that she didn't like their next album Monochrome because "it didn’t sound like her favorite song on Aftertaste, or her favorite song on even Size Matters." "Smart" (a.k.a. "Opportunity"), "Enemies" and "Unwound", were originally recorded as Gandhi tracks, Page Hamilton's previous band.

=== Artwork ===
The album cover features a black and white photo of a young girl holding a magnifying glass. The photo was taken by Frances Murray. Regarding the cover, Page Hamilton said in a 2005 interview, "the initial attraction was that it was a beautiful photo, this sort of innocence and open mindedness that kids have about things. She's got a magnifying glass up to her eye so you can see her eyeball enlarged. Kids I believe start out with a natural inquisitiveness and a natural open mindedness, and they will do the right thing. Eventually if we continue to fill them full of shit they will be swayed."

== Release and promotion ==
The album was scheduled to be released on September 14, 2004, but was pushed back to October 5 after Hamilton broke his collarbone in a mountain biking accident, delaying the band's touring schedule that was supposed to begin three days after the planned release. The Size Matters tour would instead start in mid-October, with these shows being Helmet's first since December 10, 1997. Earlier in 2004, a greatest hits album titled Unsung: The Best of Helmet (1991–1997) was released by Interscope, although it had already been in the works prior to Helmet's official reunion, with the album originally being announced in August 2003.

Size Matters debuted at No. 121 on the Billboard 200, selling 9,723 copies in its first week. Size Matters had two singles; "See You Dead" and "Unwound". The track "Throwing Punches" was also included on the film soundtrack for Underworld, and "Crashing Foreign Cars" was featured in the video game Need for Speed: Underground 2.

== Critical reception ==
Professional ratings
Aggregate scores
Source	Rating
Metacritic	52/100
Review scores
Source	Rating
AllMusic	3/5 stars
Blabbermouth	5/10
Collector's Guide to Heavy Metal	7/10
The Encyclopedia of Popular Music	2/5 stars
Entertainment Weekly	C+
Now	2/5 stars
Pitchfork	5.4/10
Q	2/5 stars
Rock Hard	6/10
Rolling Stone	2/5 stars

According to the review aggregator Metacritic, Size Matters received "mixed or average reviews" based on a weighted average score of 52 out of 100 from 8 critic scores. At Pitchfork writer David Raposa gave the album a mixed review. He criticized the band's change in sound writing, "Helmet attempt to diversify their portfolio, offering dynamics and approachable melodies and other types of listener-friendly capitulations one wouldn't associate with the folks that dropped Meantime and 'Unsung'."

Johnny Loftus of AllMusic gave the album 3 stars and wrote in his review, "Size Matters emphasizes for the bloated alt-metal elite what it means to have craft and a little self-control. It isn't necessarily memorable, but as an exercise in measured, even artistic rage, it's classic Hamilton." Josh Zanger of LAS Magazine explained, "Size Matters seems to come up a little short in certain areas though. The overall sound is a bit too polished and loses some of the raw power edge that previous albums rode to critical success. This slickness also makes the weaker songs forgettable and bland, and a few of the choruses are forced into overextensions. At times, elated melodies contradict the darker pounding force of previously established riffs and sound like unnatural ideas that never fully blossomed." In Music We Trust also noted the more polished sound, in addition to the lineup changes, stating in their review, "Page Hamilton has embarked on a comeback with Size Matters, but, like Dave Mustaine, he keeps the band name yet changes the entire lineup sans himself. Armed with Frank Bello (Anthrax), John Tempesta (White Zombie), and Chris Traynor (Orange 9mm), the '04 Helmet lineup reads like the New York Metal All-Star team."

In a review with Rolling Stone, Christian Hoarde gave the release 2 stars out of 5, explaining, "On their first disc in seven years, the manicured riffs remain, but the sludge is so overbearing that anyone born during the Eighties will wonder what once made them special." Scene Point Blank wrote in their November 2004 review that, "On one hand, we have songs such as 'Smart', 'Everybody Loves You', and 'Throwing Punches'. These songs find Hamilton utilizing his 'red-neck truck driver' voice. Musically, these songs feature the more aggressive riffs and fast-paced drumming that rekindle thoughts of Helmet material found on Strap it On. On the other hand, we have 'Crashing Foreign Cars' and 'Unwound' that feature the softer and more accessible Hamilton. As a whole, these types of songs are much more prevalent on Size Matters." They concluded their review by stating, "while it's nice to have a solid rock band like Helmet around again, the cohesion from albums like Meantime and Betty is lacking on this latest effort. But despite the sub par return endeavor, Helmet still executes alternative metal superior to that of the 'nu-metal' parade that they involuntarily influenced."

=== Legacy ===
In 2011, Decibel Magazine gave the album a critical reappraisal, and claimed "Size Matters was not only a more cohesive and confident return from the break-up than some of their contemporaries (looking at you, Prong, [and] lame-o supergroups), but also offered some killer live shows with Frank Bello on bass. It was and is a natural sequel to Aftertaste and a valiant fuck-you to the emo foppishness and Maidenesque fret-wankery that was invading metal at the time, despite it sharing emo’s preoccupation about women ruining your life."

Shortly after the release of their eight album Dead to the World, Page Hamilton reflected in an interview, "I would say that I like the first four albums best, Strap It On (1990) Meantime (1992), Betty (1994) and Aftertaste (1997), because they were created with the original line-up in a natural way. I still like those albums a lot. The comeback album, Size Matters, was also a great experience for me, but we had a lot of pressure on us because it was the first Helmet album after eight years."

Frank Bello has since spoken positively of his brief stint with Helmet. In a 2014 interview with Louder Sound, Bello reflected, "I went to go jam with Helmet for a year and a half of fucking the best fun. Page Hamilton, John Tempesta and Chris Traynor, we had a ball. Great musicians in that group — absolutely great musicians. And you know what? I think it made me a better bass player. It made me dig in with a pick, and it was a different form of playing for me. And I really enjoyed it."

Norma Jean vocalist Cory Brandan picked "See You Dead" and "Throwing Punches" as among the ten best Helmet songs in an article written for Louder Sound in 2017. In August 2013, the band Primer 55 covered "See You Dead" at a live show. Former Helmet drummer John Stanier had previously played on their 2001 album (The) New Release.

== Track listing ==
No.	Title	Writer(s)	Length
1.	"Smart"	Page Hamilton	3:44
2.	"Crashing Foreign Cars"	Hamilton; Rob Nicholson; John Tempesta; Chris Traynor	2:31
3.	"See You Dead"	Hamilton	3:48
4.	"Drug Lord"	Hamilton	3:24
5.	"Enemies"	Hamilton; Charlie Clouser	5:00
6.	"Unwound"	Hamilton; Chris Bjorkland; Mike Conlin; Jeff Craig; Christopher Scheidel	4:12
7.	"Everybody Loves You"	Hamilton	3:27
8.	"Surgery"	Hamilton	3:14
9.	"Speak and Spell"	Hamilton; Clouser	3:31
10.	"Throwing Punches"	Hamilton; Clouser	3:44
11.	"Last Breath"	Hamilton; Tempesta; Traynor	3:03
Total length:			39:35

Japanese edition bonus tracks
No.	Title	Length
12.	"Black Light"	3:40
13.	"Just Like Me"	4:42
Total length:		47:56

== Personnel ==
Credits adapted from Tidal and liner notes.

Musicians

- Page Hamilton – guitar, vocals
- Chris Traynor – guitar, bass
- John Tempesta – drums
- Frank Bello – live bass

Production

- Page Hamilton − producer
- Mark Renk − producer
- Jay Baumgardner − producer, mixer
- Charlie Clouser − producer
- Christopher Holmes – engineer
- Dan Certa – engineer
- Ryan Boesch – engineer

== Chart positions ==
Year	Chart	Position
2004	Billboard 200	121
2004	Australian Albums (ARIA)	168
