= Orange 9mm =

American post-hardcore band

- Promotional photo of the band. Left to right: Taylor McLam, Chris Traynor, Chaka Malik, Matthew Cross

Background information
- Origin: New York City, U.S.
- Genres: Post-hardcore; alternative metal; rap metal
- Years active: 1994–2000; 2024–present
- Labels: Revelation; EastWest; Atlantic; Ng; Thirty Something
- Members: Chaka Malik; Taylor McLam; Cory Bonfiglio; Chris Enríquez
- Past members: Chris Traynor; Larry Gorman; Eric Rice; Matthew Cross; Davide Gentile; Chris Vitali; Greg Eckelman; Alex Bongiorno; Dan Spellman

Orange 9mm is an American post-hardcore band, formed in New York City during 1994. The original lineup consisted of vocalist Chaka Malik, guitarist Chris Traynor, drummer Larry Gorman, and bassist Eric Rice. After the recording of Orange 9mm in 1994, Rice was replaced by Davide Gentile. Gorman was then replaced by Matthew Cross. Orange 9mm signed a deal with the major label EastWest Records to release 1995's Driver Not Included, which spawned their first music video, "High Speed Changer".

Gentile was replaced on bass by Taylor McLam in 1996. That same year, the band switched labels to Atlantic Records and released Tragic. The lead single, "Failure", found moderate success in the US. Shortly after the album's release, Traynor left the band; thus, McLam switched to guitar and Chris Vitali joined as bassist, leaving Malik as the only founding member in the band. Vitali left the band after the release of 1998's Ultraman vs. Godzilla. The trio of Malik, McLam, and Cross recorded 1999's Pretend I'm Human, followed by a disbandment in 2000.

Orange 9mm reunited in 2024 with a lineup of vocalist Malik, guitarist McLam, bassist Cory Bonfiglio, and drummer Chris Enríquez. In 2025, they released the first new Orange 9mm single in over two decades, "Turn It Up".

== History ==
Chaka Malik and Chris Traynor began writing songs together in 1992, releasing an EP in 1994 on Revelation Records. The line-up for this recording included Larry Gorman on drums and Eric Rice on bass. Rice left to play bass for H_{2}O, Davide Gentile joined the band, and soon after, Detroit native Matthew Cross took over on drums. With this line-up, they began writing material for their 1995 major label release Driver Not Included on East West Records (a subsidiary of Elektra Records). The album was recorded in Los Angeles with Dave Jerden (Alice in Chains, Jane's Addiction) producing. Additional songs, "Magnet", "Suspect", and a re-recording of "Can't Decide" from the Revelation EP were later recorded in New York City.

=== Mainstream success ===
Following the release of Driver Not Included, Orange 9mm toured the US with Helmet, Quicksand, Korn, and Deftones; they were also featured on the first Airwalk Sno-Core Tour. Later, they toured Europe with Biohazard, and were on the bill for three shows with the Offspring.

With Warner Music Group (the parent company of Elektra and Atlantic) consolidations, Orange 9mm moved to Atlantic Records. During the writing sessions for what would become their second full-length, Davide Gentile left the band to pursue audio engineering. Orange 9mm's second full-length, Tragic, was recorded in New York City, with Dave Sardy (Barkmarket, Helmet, Marilyn Manson) producing. For these sessions, Chris Traynor played bass. At the end of the initial recording sessions for Tragic, Taylor McLam joined the band on bass (McLam played drums in Traynor's previous band, Fountainhead). On the first day of rehearsals, McLam offered one of his own compositions, which became the minor hit "Failure". The song was recorded immediately, and included on Tragic.

Two weeks prior to the first tour to promote Tragic, Chris Traynor left Orange 9mm to play second guitar for the seminal New York hardcore/metal band Helmet. The band recruited former Supertouch bassist Chris Vitali to take over on bass, and McLam was moved to guitar.

Orange 9mm toured the U.S. in support of Tragic, with artists including the Misfits, Deftones, Sick of it All, Ned's Atomic Dustbin, Local H, and Clutch, among others, including headlining runs and one-offs with the Sisters of Mercy and Type O Negative.

=== Post-Tragic era ===
Orange 9mm was released from its contract with Atlantic following the end of the Tragic tour cycle in 1997. For the next few years, Orange 9mm would write and record a great deal of material under a wide range of influences. Periodically, the band would perform one-offs and small weekend runs; during this period they released a split EP in Japan and did a week's worth of shows in that country.

Midway through this creative process, Orange 9mm released a five-song EP, Ultraman vs. Godzilla, with NG Records, an independent with distribution through BMG. The fit between the band and the label seemed a good one; Orange 9mm was given a great deal of room to work on material, and new songs and new sessions kept coming. Over 15 new songs were recorded in the summer of 1998 in the basement of Taylor's Long Island home, and for a few months this material was assumed to be the foundation of the next record. The music was raw and experimental, incorporating more progressive rhythms, more percussion, and 1970s-era synths and electric pianos. However, the only piece from these sessions to be finalized and released was the song that became "Alien", which would appear on their third full-length, 1999's Pretend I'm Human. Soon after, bassist Chris Vitali left the band to pursue other interests. Again a three-piece, Malik, McLam, and Cross continued writing.

The band then moved to Los Angeles and worked with producer/programmer Neil Perry to create a more experimental sort of record. They hit the studio in the spring of 1999 and by the summer awaited the release of what became Pretend I'm Human. The album was a stylistic shift from their previous releases, with less emphasis on a hardcore sound with more focus on straight rapping with loops and other electronica ephemera behind it. The guitars even took a back seat and weren't the primary focus.

Upon the album's release, the band added Greg Eckelman on bass and Alex Bongiorno as a second guitarist, but Bongiorno was replaced by Dan Spellman not long after. Sales of Pretend I'm Human were low and by the middle of 2000, due to disagreements among members, the band called it quits.

=== Reunion ===
In mid-2018, an Instagram account was opened under the name orange9mmnyc. Most of the images are of records or live show images, but this gives fans hopes that "something" might be looming with the band. In March 2024, Orange 9mm announced their reunion. Alongside Malik on vocals and McLam on guitars, the lineup also included Cory Bonfiglio on bass and Chris Enríquez on drums.

== Members ==
Current members

- Chaka Malik – vocals, percussion (1994–2000, 2024–present)
- Taylor McLam – guitars (1996–2000, 2024–present); bass (1996)
- Cory Bonfiglio – bass (2024–present)
- Chris Enríquez – drums (2024–present)

Former members

- Chris Traynor – guitars (1994–1996)
- Eric Rice – bass (1994)
- Larry Gorman – drums (1994)
- Davide Gentile – bass (1994–1996)
- Matthew Cross – drums (1994–2000)
- Chris Vitali – bass (1996–1998)
- Greg Eckelman – bass (1999–2000)
- Alex Bongiorno – guitars (1999)
- Dan Spellman – guitars (1999–2000)

=== Timeline ===
Color denotes main live duty.

== Discography ==
=== Albums ===
| Year | Album details | US Heat. | Sales |
|---|---|---|---|
| 1995 | Driver Not Included: Released: 1995; Label: EastWest | 17 | |
| 1996 | Tragic: Released: 1996; Label: Atlantic | 44 | US: 47,756+ |
| 1999 | Pretend I'm Human: Released: 1999; Label: Ng | — | |

=== EPs ===
| Year | Album details |
|---|---|
| 1994 | Orange 9mm: Released: 1994; Label: Revelation Records |
| 1998 | Ultraman vs. Godzilla: Released: 1998; Label: Ng Records |
