= Chris Traynor =

American guitarist (born 1973)

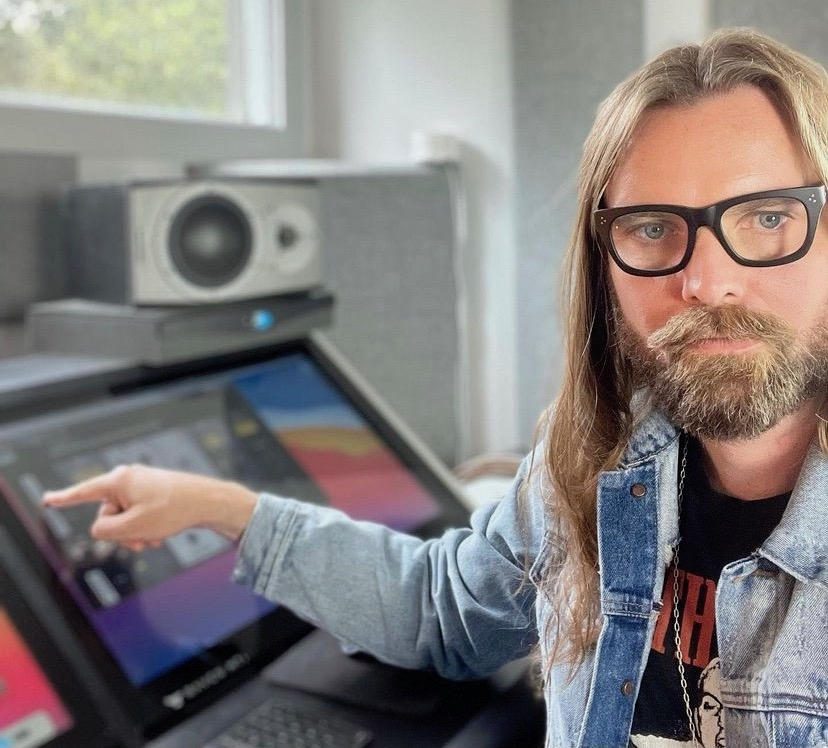
- Traynor in 2021

Background information
- Born: Christopher Traynor; June 22, 1973 (age 52); Queens, New York, U.S.
- Genres: Alternative rock; post-grunge; hard rock; alternative metal; hardcore punk; post-hardcore; pop
- Instruments: Guitar; bass
- Member of: Bush
- Formerly of: Fountainhead; Orange 9mm; Helmet; Rival Schools; Institute; High Desert Fires

Chris Traynor (born June 22, 1973) is an American musician, best known as the lead guitarist of the rock band Bush, since 2001. He was previously active in the post-hardcore group Orange 9mm, and he had an on-and-off stint with Helmet while working with Gavin Rossdale in Bush, Institute, as well as on Rossdale's solo album. He has also played with his partner Sibyl Buck in the band High Desert Fires.

Traynor has performed live with the British rock band Blur and done studio work with Katy Perry, Peter Green, Blue Man Group, and Rival Schools.

== Early life ==
Traynor grew up in Queens, New York. His parents enrolled him in the first Suzuki method music program in New York City, where he studied the violin.

== Career ==
=== Background ===
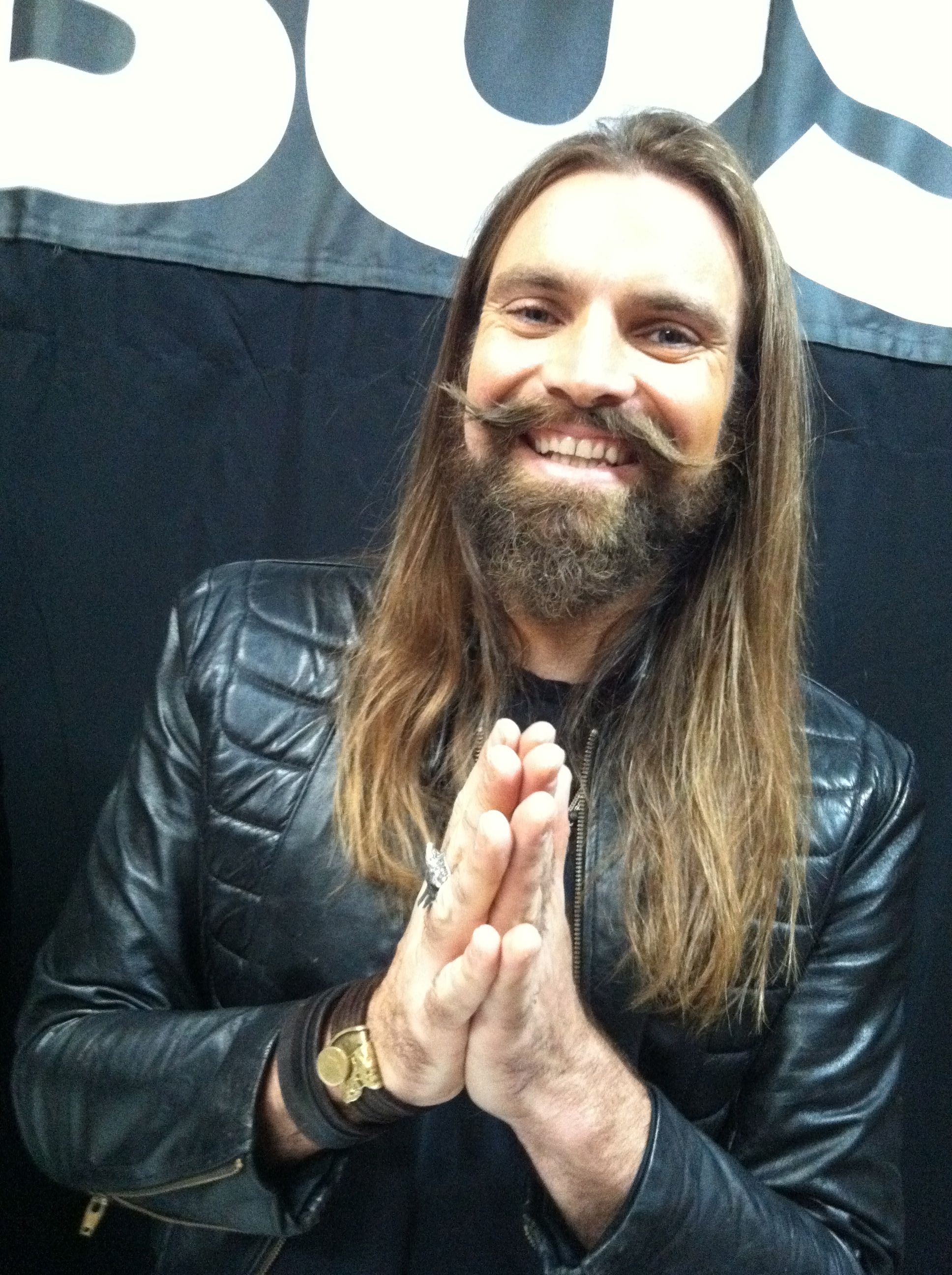
Chris Traynor in 2011

Traynor has studied guitar with Mark Lonergan from Band of Susans, Richard Lloyd, and bluegrass musician Michael Daves. He has also taken Robert Fripp's Guitar Craft.

=== Fountainhead (1993–1994) ===
Traynor played guitar in the New York-based post-hardcore band Fountainhead in 1993–1994, and they released one album in 1994, titled Drain.

=== Orange 9mm (1994–1996) ===
In 1994, he cofounded the post-hardcore band Orange 9mm with Chaka Malik. Traynor recorded three albums with them, namely the 1994 EP Orange 9mm, Driver Not Included (1996), and Tragic (1999), on the last of which he also played bass. "All the songs that I wrote for Orange 9mm, I wrote on bass. I wrote the bass lines off the first record, too. I bought a 70s stripped down jazz bass and I would sit in the corner and smoke cigarettes. When Davide [Gentile] left, I just felt like, well, I'll record the bass and it'll be closer to what the original intention was and we'll find a bass player later." Before touring for Tragic began, Traynor left to join Helmet.

=== Helmet (1997–1998; 2004–2006; 2010) ===
Traynor originally joined Helmet as a touring guitarist in support of their fourth studio album, Aftertaste (1997). "Going to Helmet was an amazing move for me. I just played with the band and we did a week of rehearsals and he [Page Hamilton] showed up for the last one. Then we flew to Austria to play a huge festival with Tricky in Ebensee. I knew those songs and I felt like they were in my blood and Page was happy to not have to pay attention so much to what I was doing. He felt comfortable with me." He worked on-and-off with the band for ten years throughout their breakup and reunion, before departing in 2006. He later returned in 2010 to help record the album Seeing Eye Dog. "I think that record was a weird time certainly for Page and I. It's the only record that we've actually talked about rerecording. In my opinion and maybe Page would be mad at me for saying this but I think that record was rushed and some of those songs are the best songs that he's written. I went in and I did my tracks and I left so it wasn't as enjoyable as I thought it would be."

=== Bush (2001–present) ===
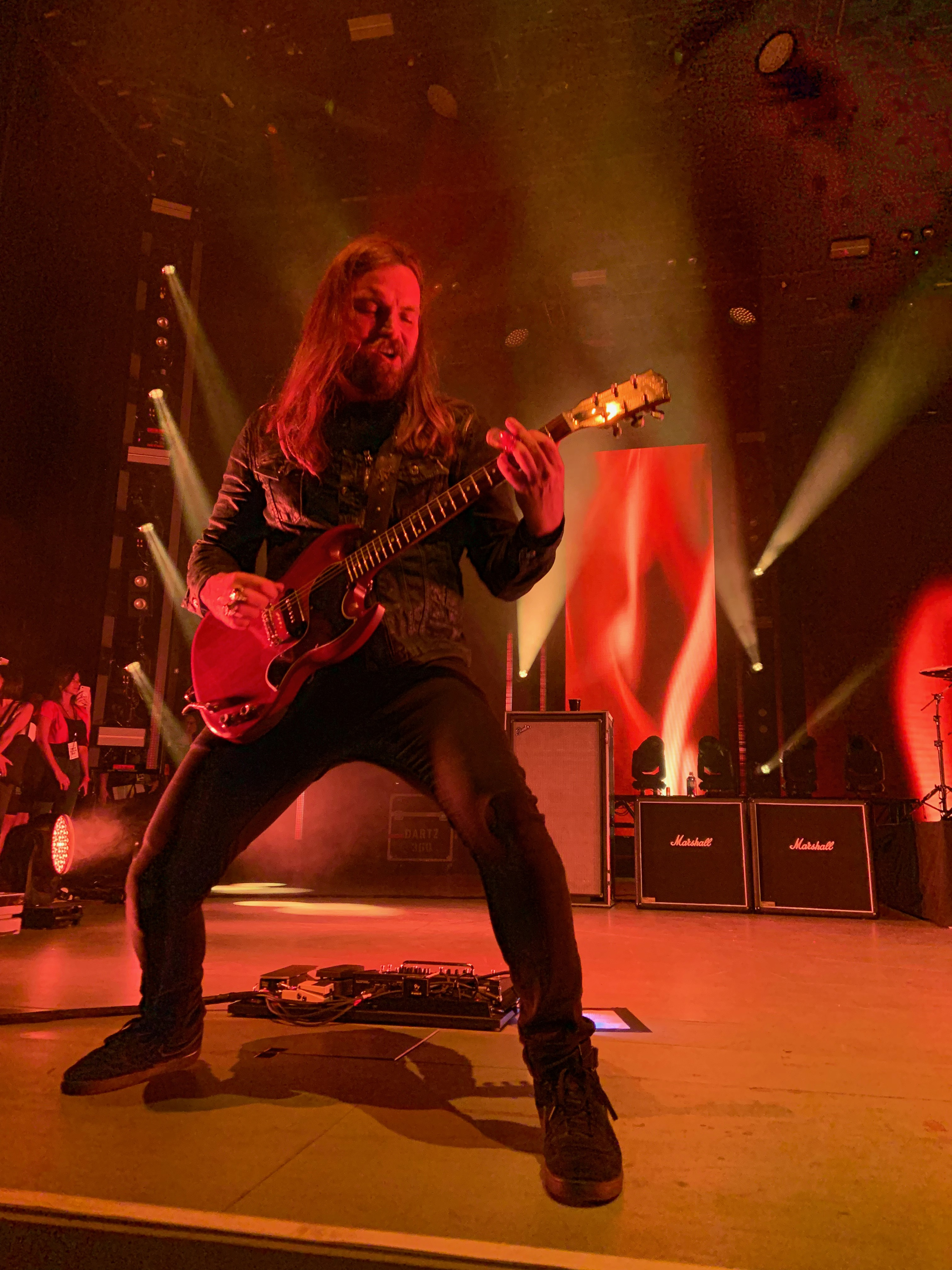
The Greek Theatre, Los Angeles, 2019

While on tour with Helmet, Traynor was noticed by producer Dave Sardy and recommended as a potential new guitarist in 2002 for the British rock band Bush. "He (Sardy) said, 'What are you doing right now?' and I said, 'Nothing'. And he said, 'There's a band that's looking for a guitar player. I'm gonna have them give you a call'. I knew he was working with Slayer so I thought it was Slayer." Bush's original guitarist, Nigel Pulsford, had recently retired to spend more time with his family, and Traynor joined in the middle of the Golden State Tour. "I have to be honest in saying that I wasn't entirely familiar with their catalog. I had known some of their songs and they said, 'Come down and meet us and if we get a vibe from you we'll fly you to Philadelphia'." The tour wrapped in July, and Bush went on pause for a number of years.

In May 2010, it was announced that Bush would be touring once again. In 2011, they released their fifth studio album, The Sea of Memories. "I really feel proud of the guitar stuff that I've done on the record and some of the songs on there are really amazing."

Traynor has since recorded five more studio albums with Bush, and he is credited as a songwriter on The Kingdom (2020) and The Art of Survival (2022).

=== Rival Schools (2003) ===
In between Helmet's downtime and Bush's break, Traynor joined Rival Schools, after the band's longtime guitarist, Ian Love, left in 2002. They recorded a bunch of songs together but never released an album. A few tracks from these recording sessions, including two co-written by Traynor, ended up on Rival Schools' 2011 album, Pedals. By September 2003, the band had split up, and Traynor, along with bandmate Cache Tolman, took on Gavin Rossdale's new project, Institute.

=== Institute (2003–2005) ===
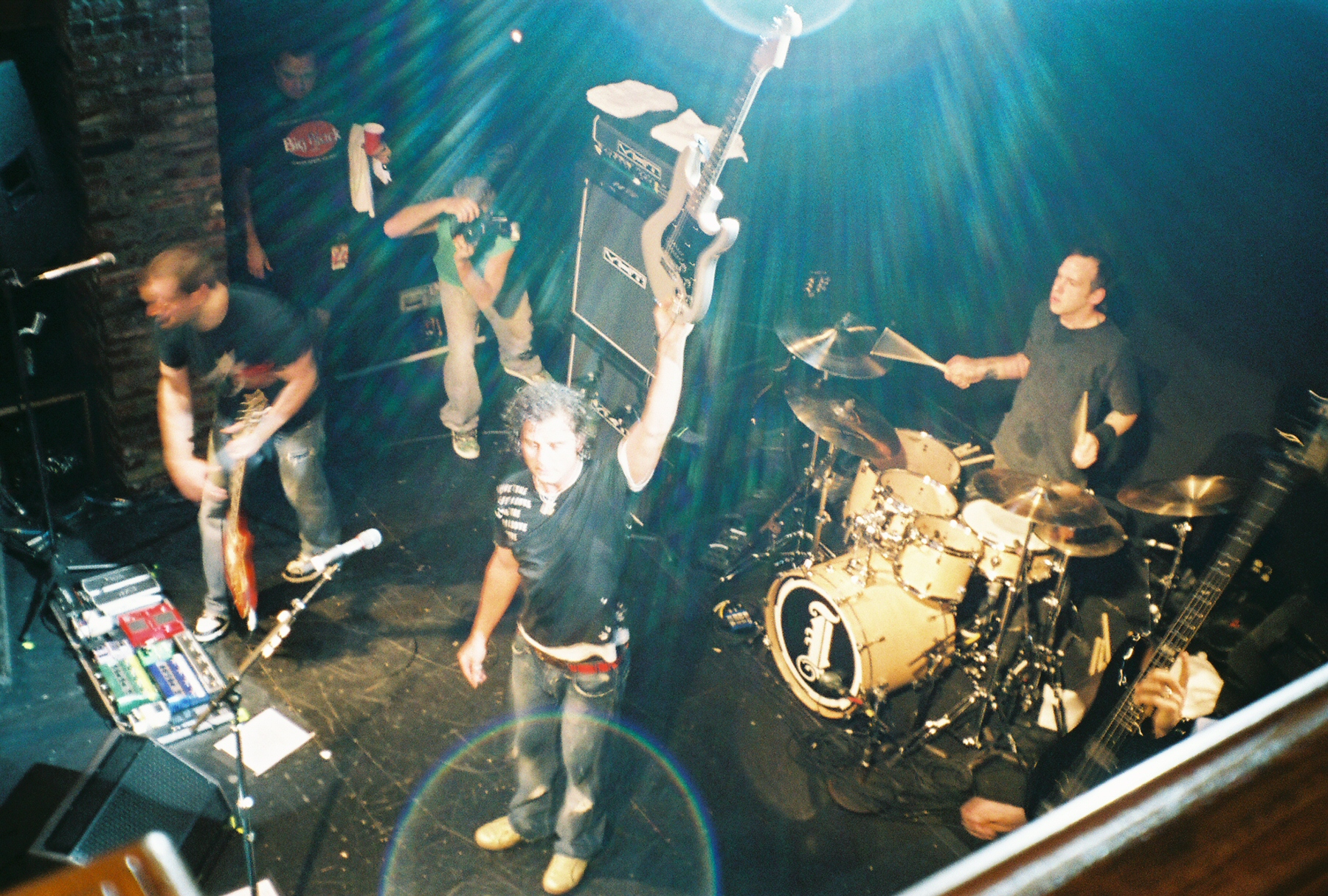
Chris Traynor performing with Institute in Jacksonville, 2005

After touring as a member of Bush, Traynor and singer Gavin Rossdale began writing songs for what would later become Institute. The band released one album, Distort Yourself, in 2005, produced by Page Hamilton. "It was a real process to get what we were doing right and Page Hamilton produced that record so it was like having your two big brothers in the studio with you and trying to make em both happy." The record saw only mild success. "I loved the way that record sounds but it didn't do what we thought it would do but I'm really kinda proud of it and the production on it I think sounds great and the songs are really strong." Institute toured throughout the United States and opened for U2, before playing shows in Europe and eventually splitting up in 2005.

=== Gavin Rossdale (2005–2010) ===
In 2008, Rossdale released his solo album, WANDERlust, produced by Bob Rock, with Traynor on guitar duties. Rossdale and Traynor toured in support of the record in 2008 and 2009.

=== High Desert Fires (2013–2015) ===
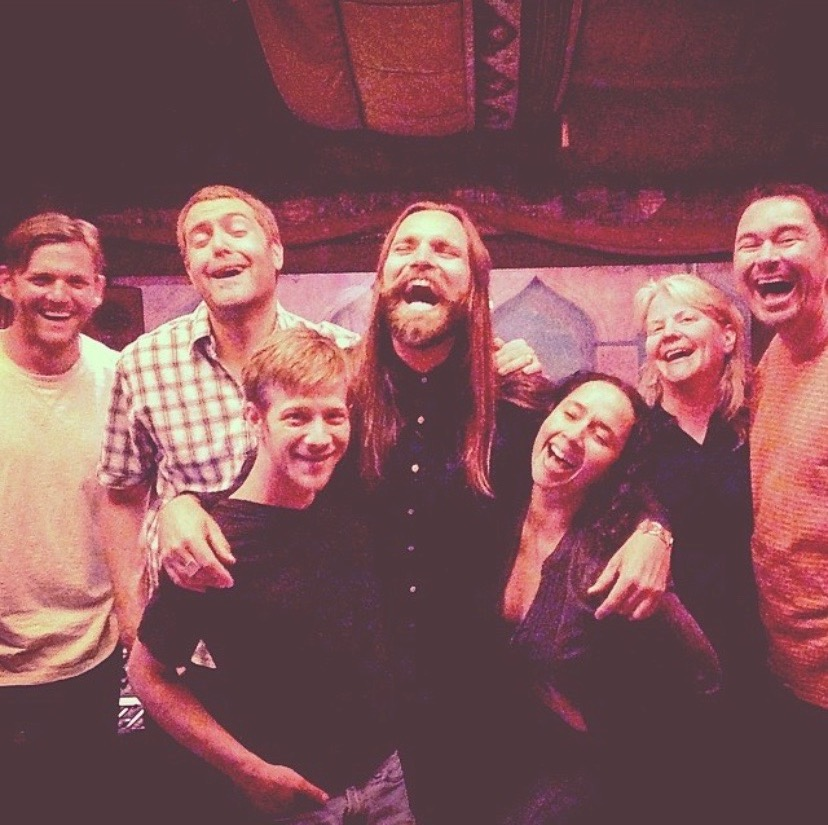
High Desert Fires in 2015; NRG Recording Studio

Traynor has a side project, a six-piece band that includes his partner, Sibyl Buck, titled High Desert Fires. They have released one album, Light Is the Revelation, in 2015.

== Equipment ==
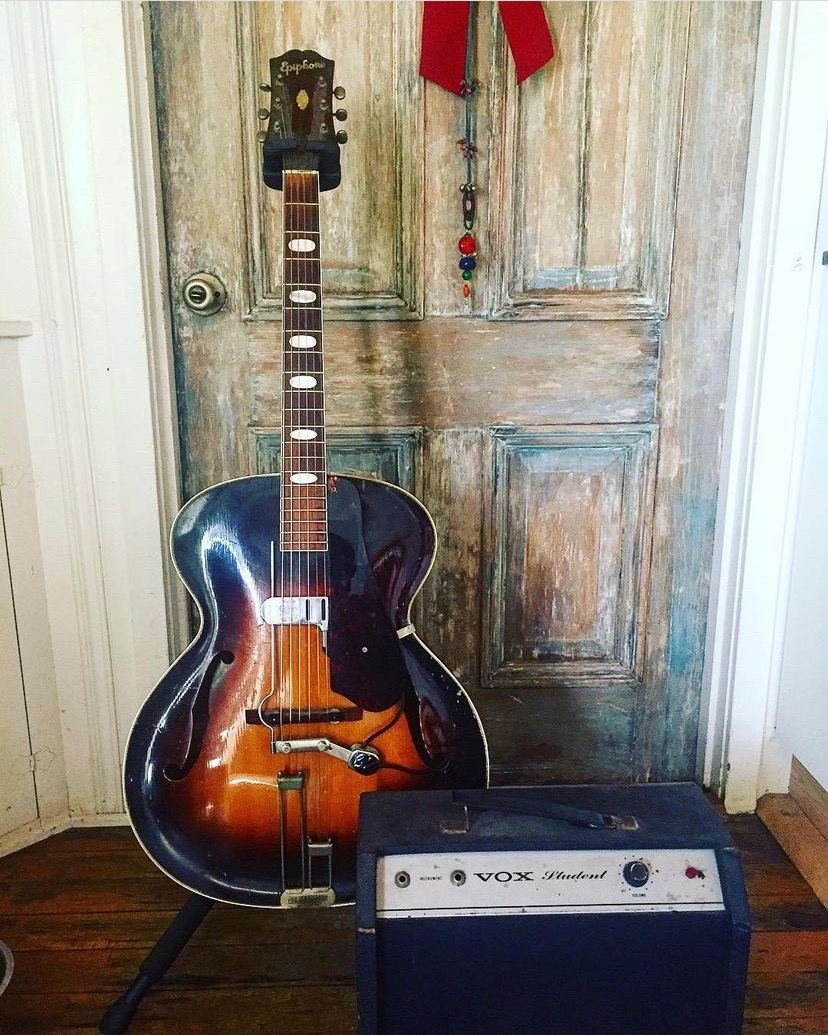
Pre-Gibson Epiphone Guitar Devon arch-top

Traynor's first guitar was a pre-Gibson Epiphone Devon arch-top that originally belonged to his great-grandfather.

His main guitar has been a 1973 Gibson Les Paul Custom, which he's had since was 18 years old. "I've used that on pretty much every record I've ever played on. I was on my way to pay the rent at the apartment we were subletting, and I stopped by Carmine Street Guitars, where they had a used 1973 Les Paul Custom. It was $850, which was exactly what my rent was, so I walked in and I used the rent money to buy the guitar."

== Musical influences ==
As an early teen, Traynor enjoyed the music of King Crimson, Pat Metheny, Jane's Addiction, the Beatles, and Jimi Hendrix, among others. Albums that have influenced him musically include Fripp & Eno's 1973 record, (No Pussyfooting).

== Discography ==
with Fountainhead

- Drain (1993)

with Orange 9mm

- Orange 9mm (1994)
- Driver Not Included (1995)
- Tragic (1996)

with Helmet

- Size Matters (2004)
- Monochrome (2006)
- Seeing Eye Dog (2010)

with Institute

- Distort Yourself (2005)

with Gavin Rossdale

- WANDERlust (2008)

with Bush

- The Sea of Memories (2011)
- Man on the Run (2014)
- Black and White Rainbows (2017)
- The Kingdom (2020)
- The Art of Survival (2022)
- I Beat Loneliness (2025)

with High Desert Fires

- Light Is the Revelation (2015)

with Grey Daze

- Amends (2020)
