= Dead to the World (album) =

2016 studio album by Helmet

Studio album by Helmet
- Released: October 28, 2016
- Recorded: 2015–2016
- Genre: Alternative metal
- Length: 36:58
- Label: earMUSIC
- Producer: Page Hamilton

Helmet chronology
Seeing Eye Dog (2010)	Dead to the World (2016)	Live and Rare (2021)

Dead to the World is the eighth studio album by the American alternative metal band Helmet, released on October 28, 2016. It is the band's first studio album since Seeing Eye Dog (2010), as well as their first release on earMUSIC and their first one with bassist Dave Case.

The first song to be released from the album, "Bad News", premiered on October 5, 2016.

== Reception ==
Professional ratings
Aggregate scores
Source	Rating
Metacritic	71/100
Review scores
Source	Rating
AllMusic	3/5 stars
Blabbermouth.net	7/10
Classic Rock	3.5/5 stars
Pitchfork	6.8/10
PopMatters	7/10 stars
Punknews.org	3/5 stars

According to the review aggregator Metacritic, Dead to the World received "generally favorable reviews" based on a weighted average score of 71 out of 100 from 6 critic scores.

AllMusic's James Christopher Monger awarded it three out of five stars, and wrote "the veteran, genre-juggling metal outfit's first collection of new music in six years, Dead to the World continues in the vein of 2010's Seeing Eye Dog, introducing elements of shoegaze and Foo Fighters-esque alt-rock into their already sizeable arsenal of sonic weaponry." He further adds, "fans looking for a direct line to the band's 'Unsung' heyday will find that the alt-metal might that fueled their early recordings is no longer dialed in at 11, but Hamilton remains a compelling figure who is just as content engaging the listener's cerebrum as he is in landing a haymaker."

Pitchfork writer Saby Reyes-Kulkarni gave the album 6.8 out of 10. Kulkarni wrote that, "Hamilton takes more chances than he ever has on Dead to the World", and that, "going all the way back to 1994’s Betty—Helmet's only other album with genuine variation —Hamilton proved that he was actually capable of introducing melody into the band's vocabulary without dulling its edge. [Both] Betty and 1997’s Aftertaste contain examples of Hamilton ingeniously weaving vocals and riffs together, expanding while also staying true to Helmet’s core sound. Try, for example, to sing a song like 'It's Easy to Get Bored' while playing (or even air-guitaring) the rhythm guitar part without tripping up. In such cases, Hamilton’s experimental instincts and songwriting acumen came together seamlessly. That doesn't happen nearly enough on Dead to the World, where too much of the material stumbles in a confused attempt to marry Hamilton’s increasingly generic pop sensibilities with the savagery of classic-era Helmet. The two elements don’t gel, and both sound forced."

== Track listing ==
All tracks are written by Page Hamilton, except where noted.

No.	Title	Writer(s)	Length
1.	"Life or Death"		3:03
2.	"I ♥ My Guru"		2:51
3.	"Bad News"	Hamilton, Kyle Stevenson	2:36
4.	"Red Scare"	Hamilton, Stevenson	3:19
5.	"Dead to the World"	Hamilton, Stevenson	3:32
6.	"Green Shirt" (Elvis Costello cover)	Elvis Costello	3:03
7.	"Expect the World"		4:07
8.	"Die Alone"	Hamilton, Stevenson	2:40
9.	"Drunk in the Afternoon"		4:22
10.	"Look Alive"		4:11
11.	"Life or Death (Slow)"		3:14
Total length:			36:58

== Personnel ==
- Page Hamilton – lead guitar, vocals
- Dan Beeman – rhythm guitar
- Dave Case – bass
- Kyle Stevenson – drums

== Charts ==
Chart (2016)	Peak position
Australian Albums (ARIA)	85
