= Gavin Rossdale =

British musician (born 1965)

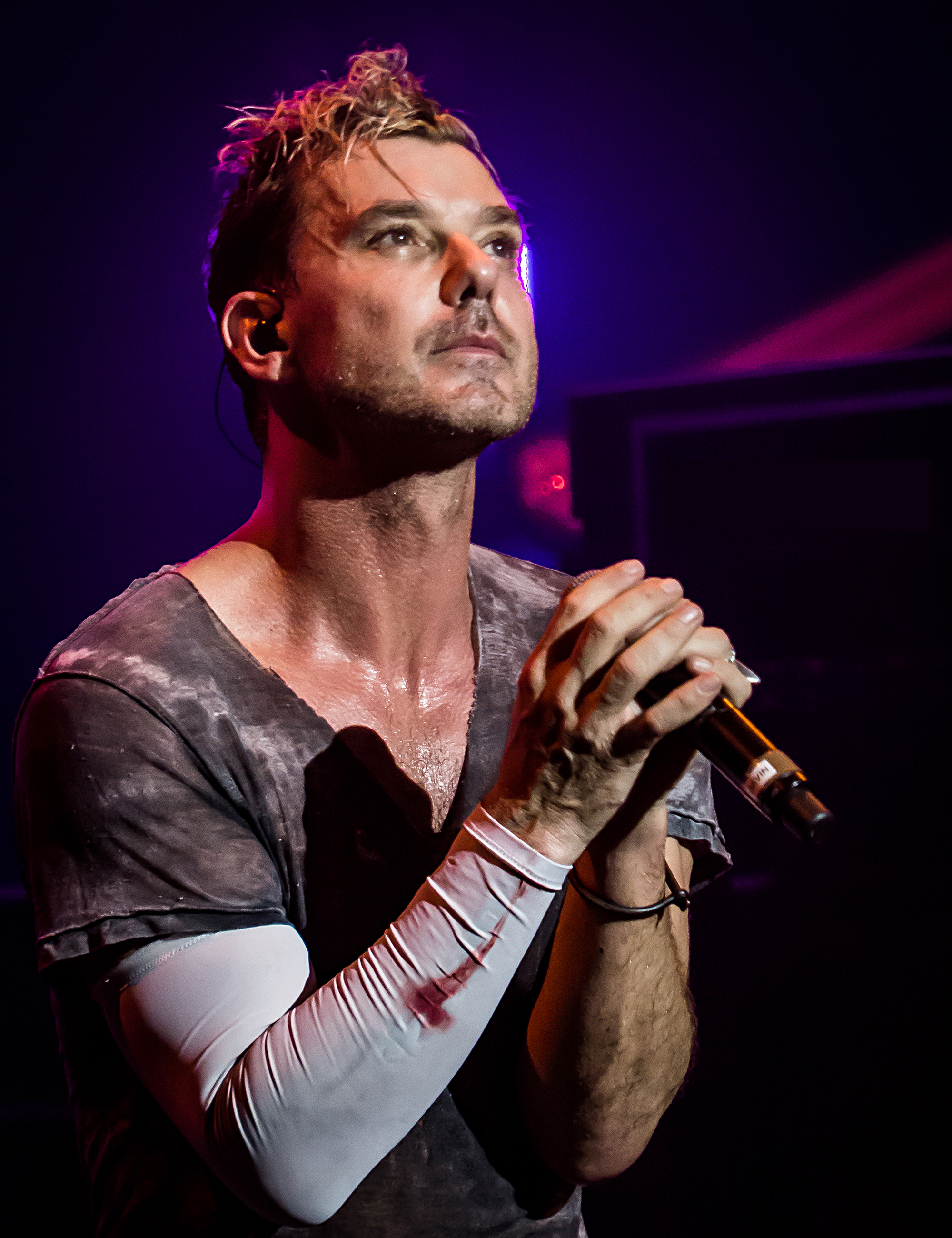
- Rossdale performing in 2016
- Born: Gavin McGregor Rossdale; 30 October 1965 (age 60); London, England
- Occupations: Musician; songwriter
- Years active: 1983–present
- Spouse: Gwen Stefani (m. 2002; div. 2016)
- Children: 4, including Daisy Lowe
- Musical career
- Genres: Alternative rock; post-grunge; hard rock; grunge
- Instruments: Vocals; guitar
- Label: Interscope
- Member of: Bush
- Formerly of: Institute
- Website: gavinrossdale.com

Gavin McGregor Rossdale (born 30 October 1965) is an English musician, best known as the lead singer and rhythm guitarist of the rock band Bush. He helped form Bush in 1992. Upon the band's separation in 2002, Rossdale became the lead singer and guitarist for Institute and later began a solo career. He resumed his role in Bush when the band reunited in 2010. In 2013, he received the Ivor Novello Award for International Achievement.

== Early life ==
Rossdale was born in London, England. (Note: Sources differ as to Rossdale's date of birth. While some sources indicate that he was born on 30 October 1965, others indicate that he was born on 30 October 1967.) He is the son of Douglas Rossdale and Barbara Stephan. His mother was born in Scotland, whereas his father was of Russian Jewish descent. His father's family's surname had been changed to Rossdale from Rosenthal. Rossdale was unable to speak until the age of four.

During most of his childhood, Rossdale was raised in the middle-class neighbourhood of Kilburn, which is located in the north of London. His parents divorced when he was 11 years old. At around this time, Rossdale became interested in the then-current 1970s British punk rock phenomenon through his elder sister, Lorraine; Rossdale said in 1999: "everything I learnt was from trying to hang out with [Lorraine's] friends. I was 12 when [punk] happened. At the top of our road was this record shop and I was always going in and getting one single at a time. That's why I've got X-Ray Spex and the Buzzcocks, practically the first edition of everything." The Sex Pistols were also an influence on Rossdale at the time, with Rossdale telling American Songwriter in 2021 that they "changed his life" and that he "fell in love" with them "when I was 11 or 12 years old", having seen them "swearing at Bill Grundy on the TV."

Beginning in 1979, Rossdale was educated at the independent Westminster School. Rossdale disliked his time at the school, as he was the target of bullying.

== Music career ==
=== Before Bush ===
A baritone, Rossdale formed a pop band called Midnight with Sacha Puttnam during the 1980s. Despite touring as far afield as Ireland and enjoying support slots for artists including Big Country and Cyndi Lauper, his band saw little success after releasing two singles.

Rossdale later became a member of the group The Little Dukes. According to Alex Tate, the Little Dukes' music was contrary to Rossdale's musical preferences at the time. After travelling to Los Angeles and New York City with the hope of being signed to a record label and crossing paths with a future Bush manager, the band broke up in autumn 1991.

=== Bush ===
In 1992, Rossdale established the grunge band Bush, which was initially known as Future Primitive. Rossdale became the band's vocalist and rhythm guitarist after befriending lead guitarist Nigel Pulsford in November 1991. Their debut album, Sixteen Stone (1994), was a huge commercial success.

Bush's follow-up albums include Razorblade Suitcase, Deconstructed, The Science of Things, and Golden State. Each had commercial success, making Bush one of the best-selling rock groups of the 1990s. Although the band reached superstar status in the US, they were considerably less successful in their native UK. The main exception to this was the UK chart success of the album Razorblade Suitcase (number 4) and its single "Swallowed" (number 7). A change in record labels and management did not bode well for the band, who disbanded in 2002.

On 21 June 2010, it was announced that Bush would return and planned to release a new album. The Sea of Memories was released on 13 September 2011. Bush have since released five more albums: Man on the Run in 2014, Black and White Rainbows in 2017, The Kingdom in 2020, The Art of Survival in 2022 and I Beat Loneliness in 2025.

=== Other projects ===
Rossdale appeared in Blue Man Group's "The Current" and is featured in its video. This song was used in the ending credits of Terminator 3: Rise of the Machines.

In 2004, after Bush had been on hiatus for two years, Rossdale formed Institute. Their album, Distort Yourself, released 13 September 2005, achieved moderate success and the single "Bullet Proof Skin" was used in the motion picture Stealth. In an interview published in November 2008, Rossdale noted that the Institute record was, "for all intents and purposes, a solo record. It was just a bad marketing decision to call it something else."

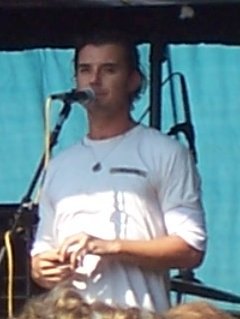
Rossdale in August 2005

Rossdale's first solo record, entitled Wanderlust, was released on 3 June 2008. Gwen Stefani, Rossdale's then-wife, sang background vocals on the track "Can't Stop the World", with other vocalists on the album including Shirley Manson, Katy Perry and Dave Stewart.

On 1 April 2008 the first single from Wanderlust, "Love Remains the Same", was released through digital retailers. It entered the Billboard Hot 100 at number 76, rising to 27 in October 2008, giving Rossdale his first top 40 hit since the days when he fronted Bush. Rossdale mounted a full-scale solo tour in spring 2009. Of the album's title, Rossdale said, "I just liked it because it's kind of sexy enough, it's powerful, it's one word. Wanderlust sums up that desire for music and for singing and performing and this life."

Rossdale also provides the vocals for the Apocalyptica song "End of Me", which is the lead single from their 2010 album, 7th Symphony.

Rossdale was a judge for the tenth annual Independent Music Awards to support independent artists' careers. In 2013, Rossdale was awarded in the Ivor Novello Awards, for International Achievement in Songwriting, which was presented to him by Chris Martin. On 27 October 2017, Rossdale sang with Linkin Park at their special memorial concert in memory of vocalist Chester Bennington. He performed the song "Leave Out All the Rest."

== Acting career ==
Rossdale acted in the film Constantine (2005), playing the half-demon Balthazar. He has also appeared in Zoolander (2001), Mayor of the Sunset Strip (2004), Little Black Book (2004), the Game of Their Lives (2005), How to Rob a Bank (2007), and The Bling Ring (2013). Additionally, he featured in the crime drama television series Criminal Minds in the episode "The Performer" (2009), portraying a rock star named Paul Davies who takes a vampire-like alter ego named Dante, whose music is involved in a string of exsanguination murders. Rossdale was also in the eighth episode of season 5 of Burn Notice, and he played the villain Johnny Moreau in the 100th episode of Hawaii Five-0 in November 2014. In 2021, he starred alongside Bella Thorne in the thriller film Habit.

== Personal life ==
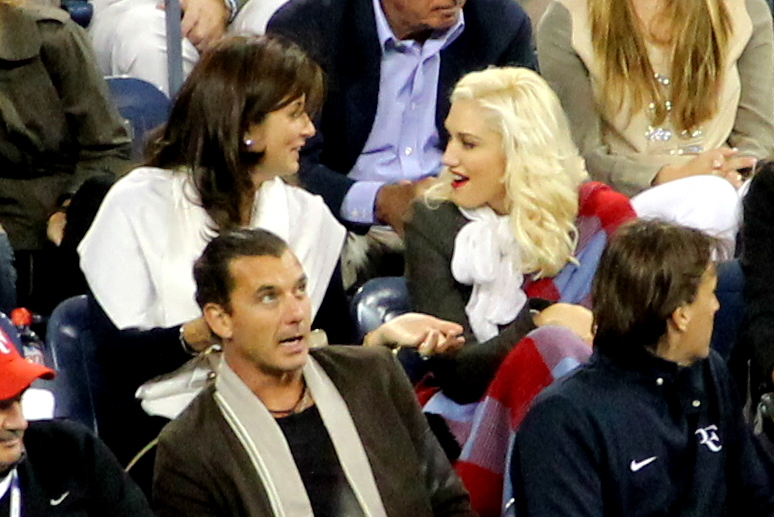
Rossdale and then-wife Gwen Stefani with Mirka Federer at the 2010 US Open

In the late 1980s, Rossdale dated Suze DeMarchi, lead singer for the Australian band Baby Animals. Bush's song "Glycerine" from 1994's Sixteen Stone is about their relationship.

In 1995, Rossdale met Gwen Stefani, lead singer of the rock band No Doubt, when No Doubt and Bush performed at a holiday concert for radio station KROQ. The two married in 2002 and have three sons together; born in May 2006, August 2008 and February 2014, respectively. On 3 August 2015, Stefani filed for divorce from Rossdale, citing "irreconcilable differences." Stefani has alleged that Rossdale had engaged in an extramarital relationship with the couple's nanny. The divorce was finalised in April 2016, with Rossdale and Stefani sharing joint custody of their three children. Rossdale agreed to an "unequal split" of the marital assets in which he received less than half of the couple's joint earnings accumulated during their marriage.

During a break in his relationship with Stefani, Rossdale dated Hole frontwoman Courtney Love for eight months in 1995 and 1996.

Boy George, in his 1995 autobiography Take It Like a Man, wrote that Rossdale had a relationship with Peter Robinson, also known as Marilyn, in the 1980s. Both Rossdale and Robinson initially denied the story; however, in 2003, Robinson dedicated the Marilyn single "Hold on Tight" to Rossdale, citing "the years of [their] passionate relationship" and featuring a photo of himself and Rossdale on the cover. In 2010, Rossdale acknowledged having had an intimate relationship with Robinson, describing the relationship as experimentation and "part of growing up." Robinson then stated that he had been Rossdale's partner for five years in the early 1980s and that he had reluctantly agreed to keep their past relationship a secret so that it would not interfere with Rossdale's rock career. Robinson also described Rossdale as the love of his life. Rossdale has said that Robinson's claim that their relationship lasted five years is "'complete nonsense'".

In 2004, a paternity test revealed that Rossdale was the father of Pearl Lowe's daughter, Daisy Lowe (born 1989). Rossdale and Pearl had a brief relationship and Rossdale had been Daisy's godfather. Rossdale subsequently cut off all contact with Pearl and Daisy. In 2009, however, several websites published photos of Daisy walking with Rossdale's son in London. Both Daisy and Rossdale said in 2010 that their relationship is good and based on respect.

As of 2024, Rossdale was dating singer Xhoana X.

== Discography ==
=== Bush ===
- Sixteen Stone (1994)
- Razorblade Suitcase (1996)
- Deconstructed (1997)
- The Science of Things (1999)
- Golden State (2001)
- The Sea of Memories (2011)
- Man on the Run (2014)
- Black and White Rainbows (2017)
- The Kingdom (2020)
- The Art of Survival (2022)
- I Beat Loneliness (2025)

=== Institute ===
- Distort Yourself (2005)

=== Solo ===
==== Studio albums ====
Title	Album details	Peak chart positions			
Title	Album details	US	AUT	GER	SWI
Wanderlust	Released: 3 June 2008; Label: Interscope	33	40	64	95

==== Singles ====
===== As lead artist =====
title	Year	Peak chart positions								Album
title	Year	US	US Main	US Alt	US Adult	CAN	GER	AUT	SWI	Album
"Adrenaline"	2002	—	24	20	—	—	78	62	—	XXX
"Love Remains the Same"	2008	27	—	33	2	28	52	24	71	Wanderlust
"Forever May You Run"	2009	—	—	—	32	—	—	—	—	Wanderlust
"—" denotes a recording that did not chart or was not released in that territory.

===== As featured artist =====
title	Year	Peak chart positions					Album
title	Year	US Main	US Alt	GER	NLD	UK	Album
"The Current" (Blue Man Group featuring Gavin Rossdale)	2003	—	—	—	96	93	Terminator 3: Rise of the Machines
"End of Me" (Apocalyptica featuring Gavin Rossdale)	2010	1	20	81	—	—	7th Symphony
"Bang a Gong" (Santana featuring Gavin Rossdale)	2010	—	—	—	—	—	Guitar Heaven: The Greatest Guitar Classics of All Time
"DooM Dance" (Gunship featuring Carpenter Brut and Gavin Rossdale)	2023	—	—	—	—	—	Unicorn
"—" denotes a recording that did not chart or was not released in that territory.
