= Bush discography =

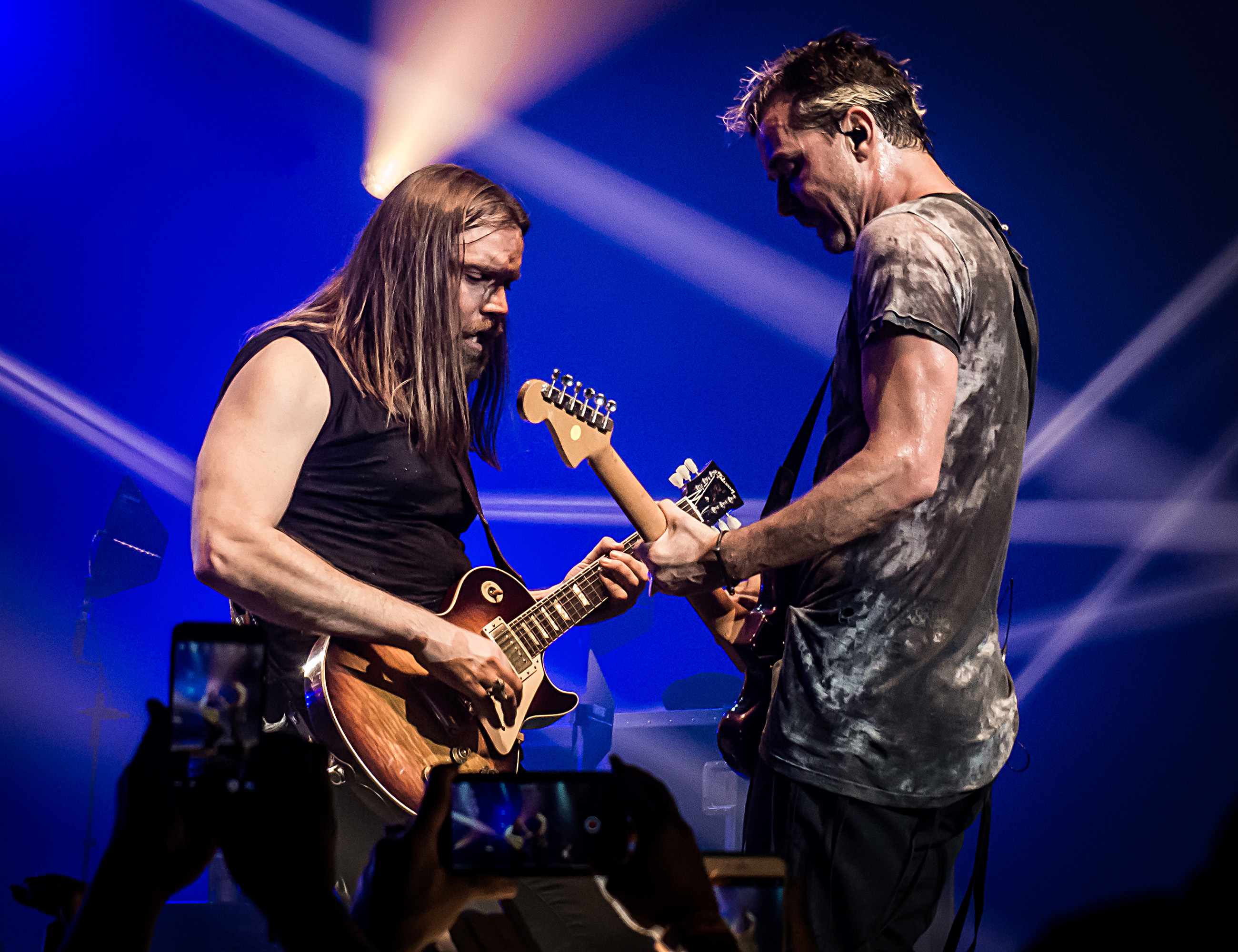
- Bush performing at The Wiltern in Los Angeles, California, 2016
- Studio albums: 10
- Live albums: 2
- Compilation albums: 2
- Singles: 36
- Video albums: 2
- Music videos: 28

British rock band Bush has released 10 studio albums, two live albums, three compilation albums, and 36 singles released on Interscope Records. The band had released four studio albums before separating in 2002. They reunited in 2010 and have since released five studio albums.

== Albums ==
=== Studio albums ===
Year	Album details	Peak chart positions											Certifications
Year	Album details	UK	AUS	AUT	BEL	CAN	GER	NL	NZ	SCO	SWI	US	Certifications
1994	Sixteen Stone: Released: 1 November 1994; Label: Interscope	42	5	—	14	4	68	20	2	82	—	4	BPI: Silver; ARIA: 2× Platinum; MC: 8× Platinum; RIAA: 6× Platinum; RMNZ: 2× Platinum
1996	Razorblade Suitcase: Released: 19 November 1996; Label: Interscope	2	12	13	38	1	37	31	10	7	—	1	BPI: Gold; ARIA: Gold; MC: 5× Platinum; RIAA: 3× Platinum; RMNZ: Gold
1999	The Science of Things: Released: 26 October 1999; Label: Interscope	28	70	18	49	6	19	48	36	33	99	11	MC: Platinum; RIAA: Platinum
2001	Golden State: Released: 23 October 2001; Label: Atlantic	53	78	11	31	28	10	41	—	59	31	22	
2011	The Sea of Memories: Released: 13 September 2011; Label: Zuma Rock, eOne Music, earMUSIC	200	—	43	—	49	29	—	—	—	48	17	
2014	Man on the Run: Released: 21 October 2014; Label: Zuma Rock	104	73	—	—	—	69	—	—	—	—	33	
2017	Black and White Rainbows: Released: 10 March 2017; Label: Zuma Rock	63	—	—	173	—	85	—	—	48	75	—	
2020	The Kingdom: Released: 17 July 2020; Label: BMG	—	—	49	—	—	35	—	—	46	27	—	
2022	The Art of Survival: Released: 7 October 2022; Label: BMG	—	—	—	—	—	84	—	—	59	58	—	
2025	I Beat Loneliness: Released: 18 July 2025; Label: earMusic	—	—	49	—	—	51	—	—	55	59	—	
"—" denotes releases that did not chart or not released to that country

=== Live albums ===
Year	Album details
2005	Zen X Four: Released: 15 November 2005; Label: Kirtland
2020	Live in Tampa: Released: 24 April 2020; Label: Cleopatra

=== Compilation albums ===
Year	Album details	Peak chart positions				Certifications
Year	Album details	UK	CAN	NZ	US	Certifications
1997	Deconstructed: Released: 11 November 1997; Label: Interscope Records	177	14	27	36	MC: Platinum; RIAA: Gold
2005	The Best of '94–'99: Released: 14 June 2005; Label: SPV GmbH	—	—	—	—	
2023	Loaded: The Greatest Hits 1994–2023: Released: 10 November 2023; Label: Round Hill	—	—	—	—	

== Extended plays ==
Year	EP details
2024	Loads of Remixes: Released: September 2024; Label:

== Singles ==
=== 1990s ===
Year	Title	Peak chart positions										Certifications	Album
Year	Title	UK	AUS	CAN	CAN Alt.	NL	NZ	US	US Air.	US Alt.	US Main.	Certifications	Album
1995	"Everything Zen"	84	41	—	5	45	—	—	40	2	5		Sixteen Stone
1995	"Little Things"	184	177	—	2	—	—	—	46	4	6		Sixteen Stone
1995	"Comedown"	—	45	—	1	—	—	30	25	1	2		Sixteen Stone
1995	"Glycerine"	—	5	38	3	41	31	28	28	1	4	ARIA: Gold	Sixteen Stone
1996	"Machinehead"	48	—	40	1	—	—	43	24	4	4		Sixteen Stone
1996	"Swallowed"	7	25	5	1	100	—	—	27	1	2		Razorblade Suitcase
1997	"Greedy Fly"	22	78	38	6	—	—	—	41	3	5		Razorblade Suitcase
1997	"Bonedriven"	49	—	—	—	—	—	—	—	—	—		Razorblade Suitcase
1997	"Cold Contagious"	—	75	57	4	—	—	—	—	23	18		Razorblade Suitcase
1997	"Mouth" (The Stingray Mix)	—	—	—	6	—	—	—	63	5	28		Deconstructed
1999	"The Chemicals Between Us"	46	93	—	5	—	—	67	58	1	3		The Science of Things
"—" denotes releases that did not chart or not released to that country.

=== 2000s ===
Year	Title	Peak chart positions				Album
Year	Title	UK	US Bub.	US Alt.	US Main.	Album
2000	"Letting the Cables Sleep"	51	13	4	26	The Science of Things
2000	"Warm Machine"	45	—	38	16	The Science of Things
2001	"The People That We Love"	81	14	11	10	Golden State
2002	"Inflatable"	—	—	—	—	Golden State
"—" denotes releases that did not chart or not released to that country.

=== 2010s ===
Year	Title	Peak chart positions						Album
Year	Title	CAN	CAN Alt.	US Bub.	US Rock	US Alt.	US Main.	Album
2010	"Afterlife"	—	—	—	29	22	34	The Sea of Memories
2011	"The Sound of Winter"	71	2	4	1	1	4	The Sea of Memories
2012	"Baby Come Home"	—	—	—	25	16	28	The Sea of Memories
2012	"Glycerine" (Live) (featuring Gwen Stefani)	—	—	—	38	—	—	Non-album single
2014	"The Only Way Out"	—	—	—	38	16	12	Man on the Run
2017	"Mad Love"	—	—	—	—	—	39	Black and White Rainbows
2017	"The Beat of Your Heart"	—	—	—	—	—	27	Black and White Rainbows
2017	"This Is War"	—	—	—	—	—	17	Black and White Rainbows
2019	"Bullet Holes"	—	—	—	—	—	17	John Wick 3 soundtrack / The Kingdom
"—" denotes releases that did not chart or not released to that country.

=== 2020s ===
Year	Title	Peak chart positions					Album
Year	Title	US Alt.	US Hard Rock	US Main.	CZE Rock	GER Alt.	Album
2020	"Flowers on a Grave"	—	12	10	7	—	The Kingdom
2020	"The Kingdom"	—	—	16	—	8	The Kingdom
2020	"The Kingdom" (acoustic)	—	—	—	—	—	Non-album single
2022	"More Than Machines"	30	20	2	12	—	The Art of Survival
2023	"All Things Must Change"	—	—	14	—	—	The Art of Survival
2023	"Nowhere to Go but Everywhere"	—	—	17	—	—	Loaded: The Greatest Hits 1994–2023
2025	"The Land of Milk and Honey"	—	—	2	—	1	I Beat Loneliness
"—" denotes releases that did not chart or not released to that country.

Notes

- A"Letting the Cables Sleep" did not peak on the US Billboard Hot 100 chart, but peaked at number 13 on the Bubbling Under Hot 100 chart, which acts as a 25 song extension of the Hot 100.
- B"The People That We Love" did not peak on the US Billboard Hot 100 chart, but peaked at number 14 on the Bubbling Under Hot 100 chart, which acts as a 25 song extension of the Hot 100.
- C"The Sound of Winter" did not peak on the US Billboard Hot 100 chart, but peaked at number 4 on the Bubbling Under Hot 100 chart, which acts as a 25 song extension of the Hot 100.

=== Promotional singles ===
Year	Title	Peak chart positions		Album
Year	Title	US Alt.	US Main.	Album
1997	"Personal Holloway"	—	—	Razorblade Suitcase
2001	"Headful of Ghosts"	38	34	Golden State
2015	"Man on the Run"	—	—	Man on the Run
2015	"Loneliness Is a Killer"	—	—	Man on the Run
2016	"People at War"	—	—	Black and White Rainbows
2017	"Lost in You"	—	—	Black and White Rainbows
2020	"Blood River"	—	—	The Kingdom
2020	"Quicksand"	—	—	The Kingdom
2022	"Heavy Is the Ocean"	—	—	The Art of Survival
2025	"60 Ways to Forget People"	—	—	I Beat Loneliness
"—" denotes releases that did not chart or not released to that country.

== Videography ==
=== Concert films ===
Year	Album details	Certifications
1997	Alleys & Motorways: Released: 18 November 1997; Label: Interscope Records	CAN: Platinum
2002	The Best of '94–'99: Released: 28 May 2002; Label: SPV GmbH	
2005	Zen X Four: Released: 15 November 2005; Label: Kirtland Records	
2013	Live!: Filmed at the Roseland Theatre in Portland, Oregon, September 18th, 2011; Released: 1 March 2013; Label: earMUSIC	
2013	Live from Austin, Texas: Released: 15 April 2013; Label: TourGigs	
2020	Live in Tampa: Filmed at MidFlorida Amphitheater 16 August 2019; Released: 24 April 2020; Label: Cleopatra Records	

=== Music videos ===
Year	Title	Director(s)
1994	"Everything Zen"	Matt Mahurin
1995	"Little Things"	Matt Mahurin
1995	"Comedown"	Jake Scott
1995	"Glycerine"	Kevin Kerslake
1996	"Machinehead"	Shawn Mortensen
1996	"Swallowed"	Jamie Morgan
1997	"Greedy Fly"	Marcus Nispel
1997	"Cold Contagious"	Mark LeBon
1997	"Personal Holloway"	John Hillcoat
1997	"Bonedriven"	Mark LeBon
1997	"Mouth (The Stingray Mix)"	John Hillcoat
1999	"The Chemicals Between Us"	Stéphane Sednaoui
2000	"Warm Machine"	Russell Thomas and Steve Jones
2000	"Letting the Cables Sleep"	Joel Schumacher
2001	"The People That We Love"	Ulf Buddensieck
2002	"Inflatable"	Giuseppe Capotondi
2011	"The Sound of Winter"	Meiert Avis
2012	"Baby Come Home"	Todd Stefani
2012	"The Afterlife"	Jonathan Beswick
2014	"The Only Way Out"	Jesse Davey
2016	"This House Is On Fire"	Jesse Davey
2016	"People At War"	Jesse Davey
2017	"Mad Love"	Jesse Davey
2017	"Lost In You"	Jesse Davey
2019	"Bullet Holes"	Jesse Davey
2020	"Flowers On A Grave"	Jesse Davey
2022	"More Than Machines"	from live footage broadcast
2023	"Nowhere To Go But Everywhere"	Jesse Davey
2025	"The Land of Milk and Honey"	Jesse Davey
2025	"Scars"	Ryan Valdez
2025	"I Beat Loneliness"	Ryan Valdez
2026	"I Am Here to Save Your Life"	from live footage broadcast
