= Loaded: The Greatest Hits 1994–2023 =

Greatest hits album by Bush
- Released: 10 November 2023
- Recorded: January 1994 – 2023
- Studio: Various
- Genre: Post-grunge; grunge; hard rock; alternative rock
- Length: 88:22
- Label: Round Hill

Bush chronology
The Art of Survival (2023)	Loaded: The Greatest Hits 1994–2023 (2023)	Loads of Remixes (2024)

Singles from Loaded: The Greatest Hits 1994–2023
- 1. "Nowhere To Go But Everywhere" Released: 2023

Loaded: The Greatest Hits 1994–2023 is a greatest hits compilation album by the British rock band Bush. Released on 10 November 2023, it is Bush's second greatest hits album overall, and the first released after their 2010 reunion.

Loaded: The Greatest Hits 1994–2023 features singles from Bush's nine studio albums released up the that point, from their debut Sixteen Stone (1994) to The Art of Survival (2023), with the addition of the Stingray remix of "Mouth" (1997), a new song "Nowhere to Go but Everywhere" and a cover of "Come Together" by the Beatles (1969). The album's release was supported by a tour of North America in November and December 2023.

== Background ==
On 5 September 2023, Blabbermouth reported that Bush would issue a greatest hits album later that year. On 10 September, the band confirmed that the compilation would be released on 10 November that year. The band also announced an accompanying single, "Nowhere to Go but Everywhere", which was released on 22 September. On the same date, the band confirmed the titled of the compilation, The Greatest Hits 1994–2023, and announced a promotional tour that November and December in support of the album.

Gavin Rossdale had initially been reluctant to release a Bush "greatest hits" compilation; saying in November 2023 "I never really wanted to do one because I always thought it was like a bit of a farewell, like a sayonara, a swan song". Rossdale added "I couldn’t be more swimming against that tide. I’m enjoying the music and the band so much that it feels like we never stopped."

== Music ==
The release spans two volumes, the first chronicling hits from the band's 1990s studio albums, plus the remix album Deconstructed (1997), differing only slightly from the first Bush greatest hits The Best of '94–'99 (2005). The second features tracks from the classic lineup's final album Golden State (2001), plus a single each from the post-reunion albums The Sea of Memories (2011), Man on the Run (2014), Black and White Rainbows (2017) and The Art of Survival (2022), three tracks from The Kingdom (2020), a new single "Nowhere to Go but Everywhere" and a cover of the 1969 The Beatles song "Come Together".

== Reception ==
Dave Everley of Classic Rock gave a mostly positive review of the compilation on 10 November 2023. Despite criticising the cover of the "already overproduced" 1969 Beatles song "Come Together" as "unnecessary", Everley praised Loaded as a "great primer for a band who eventually proved their worth.

== Track listing ==
All tracks are written by Gavin Rossdale, except where noted.

Disc one
No.	Title	Original album	Length
1.	"Everything Zen"	Sixteen Stone (1994)	4:38
2.	"Little Things"	Sixteen Stone (1994)	4:24
3.	"Comedown"	Sixteen Stone (1994)	5:26
4.	"Glycerine"	Sixteen Stone (1994)	4:25
5.	"Machinehead"	Sixteen Stone (1994)	4:16
6.	"Swallowed"	Razorblade Suitcase (1996)	4:51
7.	"Greedy Fly"	Razorblade Suitcase (1996)	4:29
8.	"Mouth (The Stingray mix)"	Deconstructed (1997)	5:59
9.	"The Chemicals Between Us"	The Science of Things (1999)	3:37
10.	"Letting the Cables Sleep"	The Science of Things (1999)	4:36

Disc two
No.	Title	Original album	Length
1.	"The People That We Love"	Golden State (2001)	4:02
2.	"Inflatable"	Golden State (2001)	4:20
3.	"The Sound of Winter"	The Sea of Memories (2011)	3:28
4.	"The Only Way Out"	Man on the Run (2014)	3:22
5.	"This Is War"	Black and White Rainbows (deluxe edition; 2017)	4:15
6.	"Bullet Holes"	The Kingdom (2020)	3:47
7.	"Flowers on a Grave"	The Kingdom (2020)	3:44
8.	"The Kingdom" (Rossdale, Tyler Bates)	The Kingdom (2020)	3:47
9.	"More Than Machines" (Rossdale, Erik Ron, Chris Traynor)	The Art of Survival (2022)	3:21
10.	"Nowhere to Go but Everywhere"	Previously unreleased	4:03
11.	"Come Together" (The Beatles cover) (John Lennon, Paul McCartney)	Previously unreleased	3:29
Total length:			88:22

== Personnel ==
=== Bush ===
- Gavin Rossdale – lead vocals, rhythm guitar, production (all tracks)
- Nigel Pulsford – lead guitar, backing vocals, production (all tracks on disc 1, tracks 1–2 on disc 2)
- Dave Parsons – bass guitar, backing vocals (all tracks on disc 1, tracks 1–2 on disc 2)
- Robin Goodridge – drums (all tracks on disc 1, tracks 1–5 and 11 on disc 2)
- Chris Traynor – lead guitar, backing vocals (tracks 3–11 on disc 2)
- Corey Britz – bass guitar, backing vocals (tracks 3–11 on disc 2)
- Nik Hughes – drums (tracks 7–10 on disc 2)

=== Additional musicians ===
- Caroline Dale – cello (track 4 on disc 1)
- Gavyn Wright – violin, viola (track 4 on disc 1)
- Sacha Puttnam – piano and string arrangements (track 10 on disc 1)
- Claire Ashby – violin (track 10 on disc 1)
- Alison Dodds – violin (track 10 on disc 1)
- David Lasserson – viola (track 10 on disc 1)
- Rosie Wetters – cello and string arrangements (track 10 on disc 1)
- Paul Eastman – piano (track 2 on disc 2)
- Gil Sharone – drums (track 6 on disc 2)

== Charts ==
Chart performance for Loaded: The Greatest Hits 1994-2023
Chart (2023)	Peak position
UK Rock & Metal Albums (OCC)	34
US Top Hard Rock Albums (Billboard)	18
