= Live! (Bush video) =

Video by Bush
- Released: 1 March 2013
- Recorded: 18 September 2011, Roseland Theatre, Portland, Oregon
- Genre: Alternative rock, grunge, post-grunge
- Length: 1:49:00
- Label: earMUSIC; Zuma Rock Records

Bush chronology
The Sea of Memories (2011)	Live! (2013)	Live from Austin, Texas (2013)

Professional ratings
Review scores
Source	Rating
Jukebox:Metal	4/5 stars

Live! is a live concert video from the British alternative rock band Bush. It was filmed on 18 September 2011 in Portland, Oregon, while the band was touring in support of their album The Sea of Memories. The video was released on DVD and Blu-ray formats on 1 March 2013.

== Track listing ==
1. "Little Things"
2. "I Believe in You"
3. "Greedy Fly"
4. "The Sound of Winter"
5. "Everything Zen"
6. "The Chemicals Between Us"
7. "All My Life"
8. "The People That We Love"
9. "All Night Doctors"
10. "Swallowed"
11. "The Afterlife"
12. "Machinehead"
13. "Alien"
14. "Glycerine"
15. "Comedown"

=== Bonus acoustic set ===
1. "Little Things"
2. "The Sound of Winter"
3. "Be Still My Love"
4. "Comedown"
5. "Glycerine"

=== Bonus music videos ===
1. "The Sound of Winter"
2. "Baby Come Home"
