= The Best of '94–'99 =

2005 greatest hits album by Bush

Greatest hits album by Bush
- Released: 14 June 2005
- Genre: Alternative rock; grunge; hard rock; post-grunge
- Length: 1:52:54
- Label: Trauma; SPV
- Producer: Bush; Clive Langer; Alan Winstanley; Steve Albini

Bush chronology
Golden State (2001)	The Best of '94–'99 (2005)	Zen X Four (2005)

Professional ratings
Review scores
Source	Rating
AllMusic	3/5 stars

The Best of '94–'99 is a greatest hits double album by British rock band Bush. Disc one consists of the band's hit songs, while disc two is their performance at Woodstock '99. The collection omits their singles "The People That We Love" and "Inflatable" from Golden State, due to lack of licensing rights.

== Track listing ==
All tracks are written by Gavin Rossdale, except where noted.

Disc one
No.	Title	Length
1.	"Everything Zen"	4:38
2.	"Little Things"	4:24
3.	"Comedown"	5:27
4.	"Glycerine"	4:27
5.	"Machinehead"	4:16
6.	"Swallowed"	4:51
7.	"Greedy Fly"	4:30
8.	"Warm Machine"	4:26
9.	"The Chemicals Between Us"	3:38
10.	"Letting the Cables Sleep"	4:37
11.	"Everything Zen" (The Lhasa Fever Mix)	4:17
12.	"Mouth" (The Stingray Mix)	5:59
13.	"Swallowed" (Goldie/Toasted Both Sides Please Mix)	5:48

Tracks 1–5 are originally from the album Sixteen Stone. Tracks 6 and 7 are originally from the album Razorblade Suitcase. Tracks 8–10 are originally from the album The Science of Things. Tracks 11–13 are originally from the remix album Deconstructed.

Live at Woodstock '99 (23 July in Rome, New York)
No.	Title	Writer(s)	Length
1.	"Machinehead"		5:13
2.	"Greedy Fly"		5:05
3.	"Warm Machine"		4:40
4.	"Everything Zen"		6:32
5.	"The Chemicals Between Us"		4:52
6.	"Glycerine"		6:01
7.	"Swallowed"		4:52
8.	"The One I Love" (R.E.M. cover)	Bill Berry, Peter Buck, Mike Mills, Michael Stipe	5:40
9.	"Little Things"		8:39

=== DVD edition ===
The DVD version of the album omits the three remixes, and combines the music videos and the live performance on a single disc.

== Band members ==
Bush

- Gavin Rossdale – lead vocals, rhythm guitar
- Nigel Pulsford – lead guitar, backing vocals
- Dave Parsons – bass
- Robin Goodridge – drums
