= Zen X Four =

Live album and DVD by Bush
- Released: 15 November 2005
- Recorded: 18 December 1995
- Venue: KROQ
- Genre: Post-grunge; grunge; alternative rock
- Length: 49:41 (CD); 56:50 (DVD)
- Label: Kirtland
- Producer: John Kirtland; Patrick Milligan

Bush chronology
The Best of '94–'99 (2005)	Zen X Four (2005)	The Sea of Memories (2011)

Professional ratings
Review scores
Source	Rating
AllMusic	2.5/5 stars
Pop Matters	3/10 stars

Zen X Four is a 2005 live CD with a DVD containing most of the music videos of British band Bush. The album cover photography and band logo were originally featured on their second album, Razorblade Suitcase.

== Track listing ==
Live songs performed at KROQ's Almost Acoustic Christmas on 18 December 1995.

CD
No.	Title	Length
1.	"Comedown" (Acoustic)	5:03
2.	"Glycerine" (Acoustic)	3:33
3.	"Everything Zen" (Acoustic)	5:10
4.	"Machinehead" (Live)	4:48
5.	"Comedown" (Live)	5:48
6.	"Bomb" (Live; introduction contains a rendition of "Good King Wenceslas")	7:34
7.	"Glycerine" (Live)	4:20
8.	"Everything Zen" (Live)	6:04
9.	"Little Things" (Live)	7:13
Total length:		49:41

DVD
No.	Title	Length
1.	"Everything Zen"	4:08
2.	"Little Things"	4:02
3.	"Comedown"	4:40
4.	"Glycerine"	4:23
5.	"Machinehead"	4:20
6.	"Swallowed"	4:26
7.	"Greedy Fly"	7:10
8.	"Cold Contagious"	3:55
9.	"The Chemicals Between Us"	3:38
10.	"Warm Machine"	3:54
11.	"Letting the Cables Sleep"	4:38
Total length:		56:50

Special features
No.	Title	Length
12.	"The Science of Things: About the Album"
13.	"Making of the Video; The Chemicals Between Us"
