= Loads of Remixes =

EP / Remix album by Bush
- Released: 13 September 2024
- Recorded: 1994–2024
- Length: 31:15
- Label: Concord; Craft; Zuma Rock Records

Bush chronology
Loaded: The Greatest Hits 1994–2023 (2023)	Loads of Remixes (2024)	I Beat Loneliness (2025)

Loads of Remixes is an EP by the British rock band Bush, released in September 2024 as a follow-up to their greatest hits compilation Loaded: The Greatest Hits 1994–2023 from the year earlier. Despite not featuring any new original material, Loads of Remixes consisted of remixed versions of four of the five singles from the band's debut Sixteen Stone (1994), as well as the later singles "Swallowed" (1996), "Letting the Cables Sleep" (2000) and "The Sound of Winter" (2011).

Loads of Remixes is the first EP to be officially released by Bush, and their second release to consist of remixed material, after Deconstructed (1997) from 27 years prior.

== Background ==
Bush announced on 26 July 2024, during a promotional tour for the greatest hits compilation Loaded (2023) alongside Jerry Cantrell and Candlebox, that the band would issue an EP that September. Although the EP wasn't to include any new material, it was announced that it would feature 7 remixed version of past Bush hits. In anticipation of the album, a remixed edition of "Glycerine" (1995), one of Bush's earliest hits, was released. The version was produced by the band's bass player Corey Britz and titled "Corey's Bedroom Mix". This was followed on 9 August by the release of a version of "Swallowed", remixed by GLU, a side project of Queens of the Stone Age bassist Michael Shuman.

== Track listing ==
No.	Title	Length
1.	"Everything Zen" (Jason Butler remix)	3:08
2.	"Machinehead" (The Impulse Mix)	5:05
3.	"Swallowed" (GLU remix)	4:53
4.	"Glycerine" (Corey's Bedroom Mix)	3:44
5.	"Letting the Cables Sleep" (Nightmares on Wax mix)	5:22
6.	"The Sound of Winter" (Junior Sanches)	6:21
7.	"Little Things [ft. Jason Aalon Butler]" (Kevin "Boonn" Hissink Remix)	2:39
