= Nowhere To Go But Everywhere =

Single by Bush

from the album Loaded: The Greatest Hits 1994–2023
- Released: September 2023
- Genre: Grunge
- Length: 3:45
- Songwriter: Gavin Rossdale
- Producers: Gavin Rossdale; Corey Britz

Bush singles chronology
"All Things Must Change" (2023)	"Nowhere To Go But Everywhere" (2023)

"Nowhere To Go But Everywhere" is a single by the British alternative rock band Bush, released on 22 September 2023 ahead of the compilation album Loaded: The Greatest Hits 1994–2023.

Featuring a sound reminiscent of the 1990s grunge era in which Bush rose to international popularity, lyrically, the song explores themes such as nostalgia, friendships and reaching old age.

== Details ==
The track lent its name to the Nowhere To Go But Everywhere Tour which consisted of 17 shows across the United States and Canada in November and December 2023 and accompanied the release of the Loaded greatest hits album.

The track has been described as "heavy and hard-hitting" by Atwood Magazine; Chrissie Tabone of Rock at Night said that, despite being penned in 2023, "Nowhere To Go But Everywhere" recalled "the peak of grunge" in 1995.

Described as "brooding and bold, nostalgic for the past and hopeful for the future", Gavin Rossdale explained to Atwood in December 2023 that the song was about "the speed of life" and "the friends we make and the endless possibilities before us". Rossdale further reflected on the track: "While anyone can identify with clinging to the past which the song addresses, the extremes we’ve seen some people go to for external youth is unnerving. It is a drag watching your own face age – and yet as, David Bowie said, ‘The thing about aging is you become the person you should have been all along.’ — genius. And feels true."

== Chart ==
Chart (2023)	Peak position
US Mainstream Rock (Billboard)	17
