= This Is War (disambiguation) =

This Is War is the third studio album by the American rock band Thirty Seconds to Mars.

This Is War may also refer to:

- "This Is War" (Thirty Seconds to Mars song), 2010
- This Is War (Bush song), 2017
- This Is War (Emily Kinney album), an album by Emily Kinney
- "This Is War", a song by Alter Bridge from the album Pawns & Kings
- "This Is War", a song by Beast in Black from the album From Hell with Love
- "This Is War", a song by Bush from the deluxe edition of the album Black and White Rainbows
- "This Is War", a song by Five Finger Death Punch from the album F8
