= 1996 MTV Video Music Awards =

Award ceremony

- Date: Wednesday, September 4, 1996
- Location: Radio City Music Hall, New York, New York
- Country: United States
- Hosted by: Dennis Miller
- Most awards: The Smashing Pumpkins (7)
- Most nominations: The Smashing Pumpkins (9)

Television/radio coverage
- Network: MTV
- Produced by: Andy Schuon
- Directed by: Beth McCarthy

The 1996 MTV Video Music Awards aired live on September 4, 1996, honoring the best music videos from June 16, 1995, to June 14, 1996. The show was hosted by Dennis Miller at Radio City Music Hall in New York City.

The show centered on the Smashing Pumpkins, who led the night with nine nominations. Following original drummer Jimmy Chamberlin's firing from the band due to his arrest of drug possession and the death of their touring keyboardist Jonathan Melvoin from a heroin overdose on July 12, the band opened the show as a three-piece, performing a version of "Tonight, Tonight." Additionally, the band ended up winning seven of the awards they were up for: "Tonight, Tonight" won six awards out of its eight nominations, including Video of the Year, thus making it the night's most nominated and biggest winning video; while their video for "1979" won the award for Best Alternative Video.

Canadian singer Alanis Morissette won three out of her six nominations for her video "Ironic." Tying with her in terms of nominations was Icelandic singer Björk, who also received six; however, her video for "It's Oh So Quiet" only took home one Moonman for Best Choreography. Closely following with five nominations each were Coolio, Foo Fighters, and Bone Thugs-n-Harmony. Out of these, though, only the former two ended up taking home Moonmen for their videos. Coolio won three, as "Gangsta's Paradise" won two out of its three nominations, and "1, 2, 3, 4 (Sumpin' New)" won one out of its two nominations, while Foo Fighters' "Big Me" took home one Moonman for Best Group Video. Bone Thugs-n-Harmony, meanwhile, went home empty-handed.

Highlights of the show included a pre-show set by No Doubt, who performed on the entrance marquee of Radio City Music Hall. There was also a short-lived reunion of the four original members of Van Halen, who had not appeared together at that time for more than a decade, presenting the award for Best Male Video, as well as a live interlink with astronauts on the Mir space station. The ceremony also marked Tupac Shakur's final public appearance before his death on September 13, from gunshot wounds after being shot four times in a drive-by shooting in Las Vegas, Nevada, three days after the VMAs on September 7.

== Background ==
MTV announced in June that the 1996 Video Music Awards would be held at Radio City Music Hall for the third consecutive year on September 4. Nominees were announced at a press conference hosted by Hootie & the Blowfish and MTV president Judy McGrath on July 30. Dennis Miller was announced as the host on August 14. The ceremony broadcast was preceded by the 1996 MTV Video Music Awards Opening Act. Hosted by Kurt Loder and Tabitha Soren with reports from Serena Altschul, Chris Connelly, John Norris, and Alison Stewart, the broadcast featured red carpet interviews, pre-taped interviews with the Smashing Pumpkins and Oasis, a report on the East Coast-West Coast hip hop rivalry, and performances from Beck and No Doubt.

== Performances ==
List of musical performances
Artist(s)	Song(s)
Pre-show
Beck	"Where It's At"
No Doubt	"Spiderwebs" "Just a Girl"
Main show
The Smashing Pumpkins	"Tonight, Tonight"
Fugees	Medley "Killing Me Softly" "Fu-Gee-La" "Ready or Not" "If I Ruled the World (Imagine That)" (featuring Nas)
Metallica	"Until It Sleeps"
LL Cool J	"Doin' It"
Neil Young	"The Needle and the Damage Done" (Note: Live from the Rock and Roll Hall of Fame in Cleveland)
Hootie & the Blowfish	"Sad Caper"
Alanis Morissette	"Your House"
Bush	"Machinehead"
The Cranberries	"Salvation"
Oasis	"Champagne Supernova"
Bone Thugs-N-Harmony	"Tha Crossroads"
Kiss	"Rock and Roll All Nite" (Note: Live from beneath the Brooklyn Bridge)

== Presenters ==
=== Main show ===
- Mariah Carey – presented Best Group Video
- Kevin Bacon and Rosie O'Donnell – presented Best New Artist in a Video
- Claudia Schiffer and Red Hot Chili Peppers (Anthony Kiedis and Flea) – presented Best Dance Video
- Béla Károlyi – appeared in several backstage vignettes with Lars Ulrich and Hootie & the Blowfish
- Toni Braxton and Dennis Rodman – presented Breakthrough Video
- Norm Macdonald (as Bob Dole) – appeared in a pre-commercial vignette about Viewer's Choice voting
- Beck and Chris Rock – presented Best R&B Video
- Michael Buffer – introduced LL Cool J
- Geena Davis – presented Best Direction in a Video
- Cosmonauts Valery Korzun and Aleksandr Kaleri – interviewed by host Dennis Miller live via satellite from the Mir space station
- Jenny McCarthy and Damon Wayans – presented Best Rap Video
- 2Pac and Snoop Doggy Dogg – presented Best Hard Rock Video
- Seal – introduced Alanis Morissette
- Darrell Hammond (as Bill Clinton) – appeared in a pre-commercial vignette about Viewer's Choice voting
- Beavis and Butt-head – introduced the International Viewer's Choice Award winners
- VJs Rahul Khanna (India), George Williams (Japan), Eden Harel (Europe), Sabrina Parlatore (Brasil), Edith Serrano (Latin America), Mike Kasem (Asia) and Stacy Hsu (Mandarin) – announced their respective region's Viewer's Choice winner
- Tim Robbins – presented Best Alternative Video
- Janeane Garofalo – introduced The Cranberries
- Gwyneth Paltrow – introduced the winners of the professional categories
- Aerosmith (Steven Tyler and Joe Perry) – presented Viewer's Choice
- Ewan McGregor and Ewen Bremner – introduced Oasis
- Van Halen – presented Best Male Video
- Susan Sarandon – presented Best Female Video
- Jay Leno – appeared in a "coming up" vignette hyping the Video of the Year award and the Kiss performance
- Sharon Stone – presented Video of the Year

=== Post-show ===
- John Norris and Alison Stewart – presented Best Video from a Film

== Winners and nominees ==
Winners are in bold text.

Video of the Year	Best Male Video
**The Smashing Pumpkins – "Tonight, Tonight"**; Bone Thugs-n-Harmony – "Tha Crossroads"; Foo Fighters – "Big Me"; Alanis Morissette – "Ironic"	**Beck – "Where It's At"**; Bryan Adams – "The Only Thing That Looks Good on Me Is You"; Coolio – "1, 2, 3, 4 (Sumpin' New)"; R. Kelly (featuring Ronald Isley) – "Down Low (Nobody Has to Know)"; Seal – "Don't Cry"
Best Female Video	Best Group Video
**Alanis Morissette – "Ironic"**; Björk – "It's Oh So Quiet"; Tracy Chapman – "Give Me One Reason"; Jewel – "Who Will Save Your Soul"	**Foo Fighters – "Big Me"**; Bone Thugs-n-Harmony – "Tha Crossroads"; The Fugees – "Killing Me Softly"; Hootie & the Blowfish – "Only Wanna Be with You"
Best New Artist in a Video	Best Hard Rock Video
**Alanis Morissette – "Ironic"**; Tracy Bonham – "Mother Mother"; Garbage – "Stupid Girl"; Jewel – "Who Will Save Your Soul"	**Metallica – "Until It Sleeps"**; Alice in Chains – "Again"; Marilyn Manson – "Sweet Dreams"; Rage Against the Machine – "Bulls on Parade"
Best R&B Video	Best Rap Video
**The Fugees – "Killing Me Softly"**; Toni Braxton – "You're Makin' Me High"; Mariah Carey and Boyz II Men – "One Sweet Day"; D'Angelo – "Brown Sugar"	**Coolio (featuring L.V.) – "Gangsta's Paradise"**; 2Pac (featuring Dr. Dre and Roger Troutman) – "California Love"; Bone Thugs-n-Harmony – "Tha Crossroads"; LL Cool J – "Doin' It"
Best Dance Video	Best Alternative Video
**Coolio – "1, 2, 3, 4 (Sumpin' New)"**; Everything but the Girl – "Missing"; La Bouche – "Be My Lover"; George Michael – "Fastlove"	**The Smashing Pumpkins – "1979"**; Bush – "Glycerine"; Everclear – "Santa Monica"; Foo Fighters – "Big Me"
Best Video from a Film	Breakthrough Video
**Coolio (featuring L.V.) – "Gangsta's Paradise" (from Dangerous Minds)**; Brandy – "Sittin' Up in My Room" (from Waiting to Exhale); Bush – "Machinehead" (from Fear); Adam Clayton and Larry Mullen, Jr. – "Theme from Mission: Impossible" (from Mission: Impossible)	**The Smashing Pumpkins – "Tonight, Tonight"**; Björk – "It's Oh So Quiet"; Busta Rhymes – "Woo Hah!! Got You All in Check"; Foo Fighters – "Big Me"; Garbage – "Queer"; Radiohead – "Just"
Best Direction in a Video	Best Choreography in a Video
**The Smashing Pumpkins – "Tonight, Tonight" (Directors: Jonathan Dayton and Valerie Faris)**; Björk – "It's Oh So Quiet" (Director: Spike Jonze); Foo Fighters – "Big Me" (Director: Jesse Peretz); Alanis Morissette – "Ironic" (Director: Stéphane Sednaoui)	**Björk – "It's Oh So Quiet" (Choreographer: Michael Rooney)**; Janet Jackson – "Runaway" (Choreographer: Tina Landon); George Michael – "Fastlove" (Choreographers: Vaughan and Anthea); Quad City DJ's – "C'mon N' Ride It (The Train)" (Choreographers: Quad City DJ's)
Best Special Effects in a Video	Best Art Direction in a Video
**The Smashing Pumpkins – "Tonight, Tonight" (Special Effects: Chris Staves)**; The Beatles – "Free as a Bird" (Special Effects: Johnny Senered, Kristen Johnson and Ben Gibbs); Bone Thugs-n-Harmony – "Tha Crossroads" (Special Effects: Cameron Noble); Green Day – "Walking Contradiction" (Special Effects: Jefferson Wagner and Brian Boles)	**The Smashing Pumpkins – "Tonight, Tonight" (Art Directors: K. K. Barrett and Wayne White)**; Björk – "It's Oh So Quiet" (Art Director: Teri Whitaker); The Cranberries – "Salvation" (Art Director: William Abelo); R.E.M. – "Tongue" (Art Director: Clam Lynch)
Best Editing in a Video	Best Cinematography in a Video
**Alanis Morissette – "Ironic" (Editor: Scott Gray)**; Beck – "Where It's At" (Editor: Eric Zumbrunnen); Red Hot Chili Peppers – "Warped" (Editor: Hal Honigsberg); The Smashing Pumpkins – "Tonight, Tonight" (Editor: Eric Zumbrunnen)	**The Smashing Pumpkins – "Tonight, Tonight" (Director of Photography: Declan Quinn)**; Brandy (featuring Wanya Morris) – "Brokenhearted" (Director of Photography: Martin Coppen); Eric Clapton – "Change the World" (Directors of Photography: Peter Nydrle and Marco Mazzei); Madonna – "You'll See" (Director of Photography: Adrian Wild)
Viewer's Choice	International Viewer's Choice: MTV Asia
**Bush – "Glycerine"**; Bone Thugs-n-Harmony – "Tha Crossroads"; Coolio (featuring L.V.) – "Gangsta's Paradise"; Metallica – "Until It Sleeps"; Alanis Morissette – "Ironic"; The Smashing Pumpkins – "Tonight, Tonight"	**Seo Taiji and Boys – "Come Back Home"**; Dewa 19 – "Cukup Siti Nurbaya"; IE – "Chan Tang Jai"; Put3ska – "Manila Girl"
International Viewer's Choice: MTV Brasil	International Viewer's Choice: MTV Europe
**Skank – "Garota Nacional"**; Fernanda Abreu – "Veneno da Lata"; Baba Cósmica – "Sábado de Sol"; Barão Vermelho – "Vem Quente Que Eu Estou Fervendo"; Chico Science & Nação Zumbi – "Manguetown"; Engenheiros do Hawaii – "A Promessa"; Os Paralamas do Sucesso – "Lourinha Bombril"; Pato Fu – "Qualquer Bobagem"; Raimundos – "Eu Quero Ver o Oco"; Renato Russo – "Strani Amori"; Sepultura – "Roots Bloody Roots"; Titãs – "Eu Não Aguento"	**George Michael – "Fastlove"**; Björk – "It's Oh So Quiet"; Die Fantastischen Vier – "Sie Ist Weg"; Jovanotti – "L'Ombelico del Mondo"; Pulp – "Disco 2000"
International Viewer's Choice: MTV India	International Viewer's Choice: MTV Japan
**Colonial Cousins – "Sa Ni Dha Pa"**; Asha Bhosle – "Piya Tu Ab To Aja"; Biddu – "Boom Boom"; Indus Creed – "Sleep"; Sagarika – "Disco Deewane"; Shaan and Style Bhai – "Roop Tera Mastana"	**Kuroyume – "Pistol"**; Ken Ishii – "Extra"; Toshinobu Kubota – "Funk It Up"; The Mad Capsule Markets – "Walk!"; Seiko – "Let's Talk About It"
International Viewer's Choice: MTV Latin America	International Viewer's Choice: MTV Mandarin
**Soda Stereo – "Ella Usó Mi Cabeza Como un Revólver"**; Los Fabulosos Cadillacs – "Mal Bicho"; Illya Kuryaki and the Valderramas – "Abarajame"; Maldita Vecindad y los Hijos del 5to. Patio – "Don Palabras"; Eros Ramazzotti – "La Cosa Más Bella"	**Nana Tang – "Freedom"**; Dou Wei – "Outside the Window"; Andy Lau – "Truly Forever"; Eric Moo – "Love Is So Heavy"; Regina Tseng – "From Dark to Light"

== Artists with multiple wins and nominations ==
Artists who received multiple awards
Wins	Artist
7	The Smashing Pumpkins
3	Alanis Morissette
3	Coolio
2	L.V.

Artists who received multiple nominations
Nominations	Artist
9	The Smashing Pumpkins
6	Alanis Morissette
6	Björk
5	Bone Thugs-n-Harmony
5	Coolio
5	Foo Fighters
3	Bush
3	George Michael
2	Beck
2	Brandy
2	Garbage
2	Jewel
2	Metallica
2	The Fugees

== Music Videos with multiple wins and nominations ==
Music Videos that received multiple awards
Wins	Artist	Music Video
6	The Smashing Pumpkins	"Tonight, Tonight"
3	Alanis Morissette	"Ironic"
2	Coolio (featuring L.V.)	"Gangsta's Paradise"

Music Videos that received multiple nominations
Nominations	Artist	Music Video
8	The Smashing Pumpkins	"Tonight, Tonight"
6	Alanis Morissette	"Ironic"
6	Björk	"It's Oh So Quiet"
5	Bone Thugs-n-Harmony	"Tha Crossroads"
5	Foo Fighters	"Big Me"
3	Coolio (featuring L.V.)	"Gangsta's Paradise"
3	George Michael	"Fastlove"
2	Beck	"Where It's At"
2	Bush	"Glycerine"
2	Coolio	"1, 2, 3, 4 (Sumpin' New)"
2	Jewel	"Who Will Save Your Soul"
2	Metallica	"Until It Sleeps"
2	The Fugees	"Killing Me Softly"

== See also ==
- 1996 MTV Europe Music Awards
