= The Beat of Your Heart =

Single by Bush

from the album Black and White Rainbows
- Released: 3 March 2017
- Label: Zuma Rock Records
- Songwriter(s): Gavin Rossdale

Bush singles chronology
"Lost in You" (2017)	"The Beat of Your Heart" (2017)	"This is War" (2017)

"The Beat of Your Heart" is a song by British alternative rock band Bush. It was the third single released from their seventh studio effort Black and White Rainbows.

== Chart ==
Chart (2017)	Peak position
US Mainstream Rock (Billboard)	27
