= The Only Way Out =

The Only Way Out may refer to:

- The Only Way Out (Bush song)
- The Only Way Out (Cliff Richard song)
