= This Is War (Bush song) =

Single by Bush

from the album Black and White Rainbows
- Released: 13 November 2017
- Length: 4:17
- Songwriter(s): Gavin Rossdale
- Producer(s): Gavin Rossdale

Bush singles chronology
"The Beat of Your Heart" (2017)	"This Is War" (2017)	"Bullet Holes" (2019)

"This Is War" is an anti-war song by the British rock band Bush, released on 13 November 2017 from the Deluxe Edition of their album Black and White Rainbows (2017). It reached No. 17 on the US Mainstream Rock chart, making it the highest-charting single from that album. It has the distinction of being the final Bush single to feature longtime member Robin Goodridge (also of bands Spear of Destiny and Stone Gods) on drums.

== Background ==
Gavin Rossdale revealed to Loudwire in on 1 December 2017 that "This Is War" was written as a reaction to the Unite the Right rally, a violent, far-right and white supremacist demonstration which took place in Charlottesville, Virginia that August. Reflecting on the issue, Rossdale said that the title of the song referred to wars between "good and evil" and "progress and regression", further commenting on the issue by saying "how can there be a situation where people can take anything to do with Nazis and think that something good came of that? It just makes no sense to a right-minded person."

Rossdale told Forbes in 2020 that "This Is War" was written as a "predecessor" to the generally heavier sound that would feature on their following album The Kingdom (2020).

== Chart ==
Chart (2017)	Peak position
US Mainstream Rock (Billboard)	17
