= Heavy Is the Ocean =

Single by Bush

from the album The Art of Survival
- Released: 21 September 2022
- Genre: Sludge metal
- Length: 5:12
- Songwriter: Gavin Rossdale
- Producer: Gavin Rossdale

Bush singles chronology
"More Than Machines" (2022)	"Heavy Is the Ocean" (2022)	"All Things Must Change" (2023)

"Heavy Is the Ocean" is a song by English rock band Bush, released as the second single from their 2022 album The Art of Survival.

Unlike its predecessor, "More Than Machines", "Heavy Is the Ocean" did not appear on any Billboard charts, but attracted significant attention from the music press for its bass-driven guitar riff and heavy sound. On its release in September 2022, songwriter and Bush frontman Gavin Rossdale described the song as setting the tone for The Art of Survival.

== Details ==
"Heavy Is the Ocean" is characterised by a sound described Phonotonal Magazine as "slow but heavy-hitting", opening with the bass, described as the "star" of the song, which is later accompanied by what has been described as "crashing drums and a smouldering guitar". Loudersound described the riffs that characterise the song as being reminiscent of grunge mainstays Alice in Chains and even heavy metal trailblazers Black Sabbath. Wall of Sound Australia similarly described the track as "stoner-Sabbath stuff". Neil Z. Yeung of AllMusic described the track as stomping though "old-school sludge".

Upon having recorded the track, frontman and songwriter Gavin Rossdale decided that the song should open The Art of Survival, with Rossdale explaining in September 2022: "it really sets the tone and the gravitas of the album. I love the power of the ocean. It’s mesmerizing to me. It feeds your soul". Discussing the theme of the song, Rossdale told Kerrang! in October 2022: "things were so bad for so many people [during the pandemic]. And it just kind of hit me one day: that's what [the record] should be. And it makes perfect sense. "Heavy Is the Ocean" is sort of the universal acceptance of that – everyone's had mad suffering, but it's finding the way through it."

"Heavy Is the Ocean" is in the key of C and has a tempo of 117 BPM.
