= I Beat Loneliness =

Studio album by Bush
- Released: 18 July 2025
- Recorded: 2024
- Genre: Alternative metal; hard rock
- Length: 46:31
- Label: earMusic
- Producer: Erik Ron; Gavin Rossdale

Bush chronology
Loads of Remixes (2024)	I Beat Loneliness (2025)

Singles from I Beat Loneliness
- 1. "60 Ways to Forget People" Released: 17 April 2025; 2. "The Land of Milk and Honey" Released: 5 June 2025; 3. "I Am Here to Save Your Life" Released: 30 January 2026

I Beat Loneliness is the tenth studio album by the British rock band Bush, released on 18 July 2025 through earMusic. The first single, titled "60 Ways to Forget People", came out on 17 April and was followed by "The Land of Milk and Honey", on 5 June.

Described by Spill Magazine as one of Bush's most "vulnerable" albums to date, the lyrics on I Beat Loneliness tackle subjects such as mental health, loneliness, and depression. Primary songwriter and frontman Gavin Rossdale described the record as Bush's "most personal" yet.

== Background ==
On 2 September 2024, Bush frontman Gavin Rossdale confirmed that a new album had been recorded. On 2 January 2025, he announced that it would be titled I Beat Loneliness and that it would come out on 18 July. On 17 April, Bush unveiled details about the record, which coincided with the release of the first single, "60 Ways to Forget People". The album's second single, "The Land of Milk and Honey", came out on 5 June.

== Content ==
The lyrics on I Beat Loneliness were heavily focused on mental health-related themes, a fact referenced in the title of the album; Mike DeWald of Riff magazine likened the role of frontman Rossdale to that of a therapist.

Paul Travers of Metal Hammer categorised I Beat Loneliness as "a well-constructed slab of modern hard rock with a strong melodic sensibility", also noting a few nostalgic nods to the past. Sputnikmusic described the record as "electronics-laden alternative metal". Emma Johnston of Louder Sound noted that the first half of the record "churn[ed] out one blustery grunge rocker after another". "The Land of Milk and Honey" was described by Sonic Abuse as having a "memorable melody" that comes second only to "wind-tunnel guitars" reminiscent of Rossdale's formative influences, such as Neil Young and Sonic Youth. To contrast with the heavier first half, the second half was noted as being more subdued: according to Neil Z. Yeung of AllMusic, it consists of "a string of midtempo near-ballads". "We Are of This Earth" was described by Louder Sound as "dreamy, spacey, mournful little bit of echoing shoegaze". The subdued diversion is broken by "Footprints in the Sound", on which the band pursue a nu metal sound.

== Reception ==
Professional ratings
Aggregate scores
Source	Rating
Metacritic	69/100
Review scores
Source	Rating
AllMusic	4/5 stars
Daily Express	Favourable
Kerrang!	3/5 stars

I Beat Loneliness received a Metacritic score of 69 out of 100, an aggregate ranking based on six reviews, which indicates a "generally favourable" reception.

The Daily Express wrote a favourable review of the record, calling the songs a "forceful blend" of melancholy lyrical content and "explosive" choruses. Reviewer Garry Bushell praised Chris Traynor's guitar riffs, in particular those on the track "I Am Here to Save Your Life".

I Beat Loneliness received a mixed review from James Hickie of Kerrang!, who gave the effort three out of five stars.

== Track listing ==
No.	Title	Length
1.	"Scars"	3:30
2.	"I Beat Loneliness"	4:23
3.	"The Land of Milk and Honey"	3:15
4.	"We're All the Same on the Inside"	3:21
5.	"I Am Here to Save Your Life"	4:09
6.	"60 Ways to Forget People"	2:48
7.	"Love Me Till the Pain Fades"	4:13
8.	"We Are of This Earth"	4:24
9.	"Everyone Is Broken"	4:01
10.	"Don't Be Afraid"	5:15
11.	"Footsteps in the Sand"	4:01
12.	"Rebel with a Cause"	3:18
Total length:		46:31

== Charts ==
Chart performance for I Beat Loneliness
Chart (2025)	Peak position
Austrian Albums (Ö3 Austria)	49
French Rock & Metal Albums (SNEP)	82
German Albums (Offizielle Top 100)	51
German Rock & Metal Albums (Offizielle Top 100)	13
Scottish Albums (OCC)	55
Swiss Albums (Schweizer Hitparade)	59
UK Album Downloads (OCC)	86
UK Independent Albums (OCC)	27
