= The Art of Survival (album) =

Studio album by Bush
- Released: 7 October 2022
- Recorded: 2022
- Studios: RAK Studios (London); Kingston Sound (Los Angeles); Grey Area Studios (Los Angeles)
- Genres: Grunge; post-grunge; alternative metal
- Length: 48:24
- Label: BMG
- Producers: Erik Ron; Gavin Rossdale

Bush chronology
The Kingdom (2020)	The Art of Survival (2022)	Loaded: The Greatest Hits 1994–2023 (2023)

Singles from The Art of Survival
- 1. "More Than Machines" Released: 26 July 2022; 2. "Heavy Is the Ocean" Released: 16 September 2022; 3. "All Things Must Change" Released: 4 May 2023

The Art of Survival is the ninth studio album by British alternative rock band Bush. It was released on 7 October 2022 through BMG Records and follows the band's 2020 effort The Kingdom. The album's release was preceded by the lead single "More Than Machines", which reached No. 2 on the US Mainstream Rock charts, with the album itself charting within the Top 100 in Germany, Scotland and Switzerland, spawning two further singles: "Heavy Is the Ocean" and "All Things Must Change".

The album is generally considered to continue the heavy, riff-based sound of its immediate predecessor, which The Art of Survival takes to heavier extremes, owing little to the alternative rock influences that underpinned the band's earlier work; embracing metal influences more so than before. With frontman and main songwriter Gavin Rossdale stating that the album was themed around "humanity's strides" in the face of hardship, the songs on the record feature lyrics that relate to politically charged subjects including the 2022 overturning of Roe v. Wade, climate change, the COVID-19 pandemic and identity politics.

== Background and recording ==
On 27 July 2022, Bush announced that their ninth studio album, titled The Art of Survival, would be released that October. In a statement issued by the band, they confirmed that the record had been written and recorded in 2022 and that they'd been working with producer Erik Ron, who'd produced two singles on the album's predecessor. The album is the fifth since the band's reunion in 2010, and the second to feature Gavin Rossdale as the sole original band member.

The announcement of the new album on 27 July coincided with the release of the album's first single, "More Than Machines", a politically charged anthem themed around US abortion laws and climate change, which had been debuted in concert 4 days prior at the Atlantis Concert For Earth in the Azores, Portugal.

Influences on the album's sound include Mastodon, Slipknot and System of a Down.

== Content ==
Carla Valois Lobo of MusicOMH described The Art of Survival as "post-grunge done right", while Guitar.com labelled the album's sound as "polished, modern hard rock". The Soundboard described the album as a "churning approach to grunge and alt-metal". Overall, Sputnik Music stated that the heavy, bass-driven sound of the record brings to mind the post-metal of At the Soundawn and the desert rock of Kyuss. Kerrang compared the riffs on "More than Machines" to the American nu metal band Korn, while LouderSound equated those on "Heavy Is the Ocean" and "Kiss Me I'm Dead" to Alice in Chains and Black Sabbath; the latter was described by The Telegraph as a "heavy metal Bond theme in the making". "Human Sand" was described by XSNoize as doing "the thing that Pearl Jam does so well [...], leaving the bass to be king for a bridge or two", with Rossdale telling Guitar.com that the song's riff was "most bluesy" he had ever done; Music Matters Media even compared the riff to the style of Jimi Hendrix. The more subdued moments of the album included the track "Creatures of the Fire", a ballad recalling the band's 1995 hit "Glycerine".

Rossdale stated that the album encompassed humanity's strides in the face of war, racism, gender politics and the COVID-19 pandemic. The album's lead single "More Than Machines" was written reflecting Rossdale's feelings on women's rights following the 2022 overturning of Roe v. Wade, planetary destruction and the rise of AI. Rossdale described the song "Judas Is A Riot" as being a reference to people he perceived to "drink the Kool-Aid and worship a freak".

== Reception ==
Professional ratings
Review scores
Source	Rating
AllMusic	4/5 stars
Classic Rock	4/5 stars
The Telegraph	3/5 stars
wallofsound	7.5/10
distortedsound	8/10

Neil Z. Yeung of AllMusic described The Art of Survival as Bush's best effort since their 2002–2010 hiatus.

John Aizelwood of Classic Rock gave a largely praising 4-star review of The Art of Survival.

Sputnik Music described The Art of Survival as having little in common with the band's 1990s self and as "easily [their] most unique" album.

British newspaper The Telegraph gave a mixed three-star review of The Art of Survival. Reviewer Siobhan Grogan described the record's social commentary as "clumsy" and as having "the thoughtful gravitas of a teenage boy". Nonetheless, Siobhan opined that the album's heavy sound suited the lyrical sense of doom, praising songs such as "Slow Me", "Human Sand" and "Kiss Me I'm Dead", and stated the record had a "powerful, personal relevance".

All Things Must Change was described in May 2023 by Blabbermouth as a "bruising heavy rock song".

== Track listing ==
All tracks are written by Gavin Rossdale, except where noted.

The Art of Survival track listing
No.	Title	Writer(s)	Length
1.	"Heavy Is the Ocean"		5:12
2.	"Slow Me"		3:48
3.	"More Than Machines"	Rossdale; Erik Ron; Chris Traynor	3:22
4.	"May Your Love Be Pure"	Rossdale; Traynor	3:21
5.	"Shark Bite"		3:50
6.	"Human Sand"	Rossdale; Traynor	3:52
7.	"Kiss Me I'm Dead"	Rossdale; Tyler Bates	3:45
8.	"Identity"	Rossdale; Bates	4:30
9.	"Creatures of the Fire"		4:36
10.	"Judas Is a Riot"		4:03
11.	"Gunfight"		3:39
12.	"1000 Years"		4:26
Total length:			48:24

Deluxe CD edition
No.	Title	Length
13.	"All Things Must Change"	3:32
14.	"1000 Years" (feat. Amy Lee)	4:26
15.	"Miracle"	4:16
16.	"More Than Machines" (Live in Nashville)	3:28
17.	"Heavy Is the Ocean" (Live in Nashville)	5:48
Total length:		70:05

== Personnel ==
Bush

- Gavin Rossdale – vocals, guitar production
- Chris Traynor – guitar
- Corey Britz – bass
- Nik Hughes – drums

Additional personnel

- Erik Ron – production, mixing, guitar, background vocals
- Tyler Bates – additional production (tracks 7, 8)
- Sacha Puttnam – keyboards
- Chris Athens – mastering
- Anthony Reeder – engineering
- John Ewing Jr. – engineering
- Isabel Gracefield – engineering (6, 10)
- Connor Panayi – engineering assistance (6, 10)
- Neil Krug – artwork
- Dale Voelker – design
- Thomas Rabsch – band photo

== Charts ==
Chart performance for The Art of Survival
Chart (2022)	Peak position
Australian Digital Albums (ARIA)	13
German Albums (Offizielle Top 100)	84
Scottish Albums (Official Charts)	59
Swiss Albums (Schweizer Hitparade)	58
UK Album Downloads (Official Charts)	75
UK Independent Albums (Official Charts)	26
UK Rock & Metal Albums (Official Charts)	8

For "All Things Must Change":

Chart (2023)	Peak position
US Mainstream Rock Airplay (Billboard)	14
