= Man on the Run (album) =

Studio album by Bush
- Released: 21 October 2014
- Recorded: 2013–2014
- Studio: Studio 606 (Los Angeles, California); NRG (North Hollywood, California)
- Genre: Alternative rock, post-grunge
- Length: 50:41
- Label: Zuma Rock
- Producer: Nick Raskulinecz, Jay Baumgardner

Bush chronology
The Sea of Memories (2011)	Man on the Run (2014)	Black and White Rainbows (2017)

Singles from Man on the Run
- 1. "The Only Way Out" Released: 9 September 2014; 2. "Man on the Run" Released: 19 February 2015; 3. "Loneliness Is A Killer" Released: 1 April 2015

Man on the Run is the sixth studio album by the British rock band Bush, released on 21 October 2014, through Zuma Rock Records. It marks the band's second studio album to be recorded under its current incarnation (Gavin Rossdale, Robin Goodridge, Chris Traynor, Corey Britz), which reformed in 2010 after an eight-year hiatus and released The Sea of Memories in 2011. The album release in 2014 marks the 20th anniversary of the band's debut album, Sixteen Stone.

== Background and development ==
The band spent two years touring in support of their previous album, The Sea of Memories, before returning to the studio in 2013 to record new music. Singer-guitarist Gavin Rossdale wrote most of Man on the Run at his home studio in Los Angeles. In an interview with Yahoo! Music published on 19 August 2014, Rossdale described the writing process for the album:

"They say the hardest thing for a writer is putting yourself in a seat to do it. I'm really untrained with music, so it's always a natural process of understanding more about music by writing songs. So it's a grand voyage of discovery. I have a good time doing it, I love my job. I just dive right in. I have a collection of words that I've been writing over the previous couple of years... I have a file of that stuff and each day I dive into that and see if there's anything I can salvage. Then I think of the tempo and the feeling of the songs and how it fits my mood for that day."

Rossdale says the album was written with the band's live show in mind. In an interview with USA Today, he stated, "Every song I write has to be able to co-exist with some big songs in our set list that people have come to accept as part of the fabric of Bush. There's not one song on the new record that isn't going to translate live."

On the approach to the album, Rossdale said:

"I approached the whole record from the live perspective, thinking about the EDM music and what is it that people are getting so lost in EDM about and what is the whole tribal thing that's going on there? It's that moment in Ibiza where 10,000 people lift their hands up in the air and lose themselves in the music, that whole push-pull crowd control thing that I was really interested in capturing on this (album)."

Due to scheduling conflicts, the album's recording sessions were split between Studio 606 in Los Angeles and NRG Recording Studios in North Hollywood, California. The Studio 606 songs were produced by Nick Raskulinecz, while the tracks recorded at NRG were produced by Jay Baumgardner. With Raskulinecz's background in metal and hard rock, Rossdale says he thought Raskulinecz "would never let me get too sentimental, sonically or lyrically. I thought he would keep it muscular, live and animalistic, which is what I really wanted." While recording, the band combined futuristic sounds using modern studio technology while having a "garage mentality", using pawn-shop guitars and old amplifiers.

Rossdale says he wrote about 30 songs for the album, many of which he is excited about, and states: "There easily is another record ready to go, so maybe something will come out sooner."

On 18 August 2014, Rossdale revealed the album's title as Man on the Run through a video announcement. Rossdale tells Rolling Stone the title is "meant as a universal take on a slice of my life and the people I come across. It just seems that the doors are closing and everyone is trying to figure out their way. It's the most universal title I've ever had. I always figure everyone is on the run."

On 4 September 2014, the track listing and album artwork were revealed.

On 1 October 2014, the music video for "The Only Way Out" premiered on Vevo.

== Music ==
Stephen Thomas Erlewine opined that Man on the Run had a "modern glint" to the music, and incorporated "burbling electronics" and sporadic drum-looping. The opening track "Just Like My Other Sins" has drawn comparisons in style to American grunge band Soundgarden.

== Promotion ==
In support of the album, the band performed at various shows and festivals through the end of 2014 before a full-scale tour in 2015.

On 21 October 2014, the band performed "The Only Way Out" on ABC's Jimmy Kimmel Live!.

== Release ==
=== Album ===
Man on the Run was released on 21 October 2014, through Zuma Rock Records. It's available on CD, vinyl and as a digital download. Additionally, a deluxe edition of the album is available.

=== Singles ===
The lead single from the album, "The Only Way Out", was released on 9 September 2014. Rossdale says the song is "a good gateway into the record ... it gets a bit wider and probably a little darker. This is just the right way in."

The same day "The Only Way Out" was released, two exclusive tracks were made available to download for PledgeMusic pre-orders. The songs, a studio version of The Beatles' "Come Together" and previously unreleased "Letting The Cables Sleep [Rooftop Live]", will not be on the album.

On 22 September 2014, Billboard premiered the title track from the album. The following day it was released as the second single from the album.

The third single from the album, "Loneliness Is A Killer", was released on 1 April 2015.

== Critical reception ==
Professional ratings
Review scores
Source	Rating
AllMusic	2.5/5 stars
Soundcheck411	8/10 stars
Alternative Nation	2/5 stars
Audio Eclectica	8.8/10 stars

Man on the Run received mixed feedback from music critics. In a two and a half out of five star review, Stephen Thomas Erlewine of AllMusic called the album's songs "some of Rossdale's strongest melodies in quite some time."

== Track listing ==
All songs written by Gavin Rossdale.

No.	Title	Length
1.	"Just Like My Other Sins"	3:23
2.	"Man on the Run"	4:23
3.	"The Only Way Out"	3:22
4.	"The Gift"	4:49
5.	"This House Is on Fire"	5:15
6.	"Loneliness Is a Killer"	5:17
7.	"Bodies in Motion"	4:54
8.	"Broken in Paradise"	4:18
9.	"Surrender"	4:56
10.	"Dangerous Love"	4:51
11.	"Eye of the Storm"	5:13
Total length:		50:41

Deluxe edition with bonus tracks
No.	Title	Length
12.	"Let Yourself Go"	4:47
13.	"Speeding Through the Bright Lights"	5:09
14.	"The Golden Age"	5:44
Total length:		1:06:21

== Personnel ==
Credits adapted from AllMusic

Bush

- Gavin Rossdale – lead vocals, rhythm guitar
- Chris Traynor – lead guitar
- Corey Britz – bass, backing vocals
- Robin Goodridge – drums

Additional musicians

- Stephen Bradley – horn
- Cory Enemy – keyboards
- Gabrial McNair – horn
- Jamie Muhoberac – keyboards
- Chris Vrenna – keyboards

Technical personnel

- Jay Baumgardner – producer, mixing
- Nick Raskulinecz – producer
- Gavin Rossdale – executive producer
- Kyle Hoffman – engineer
- John Ewing, Jr. – engineer
- Ryan Williams – engineer
- Paul Fig – engineer
- Nicolas Fournier – assistant engineer
- Martin Cooke – assistant engineer
- Ted Jensen – mastering
- Rich Costey – mixing
- Michael Eckes – mixing assistant
- Scott Clarke – mixing assistant
- Mario Borgatta – mixing assistant
- Michael Fernandez – mixing assistant
- Ross Garfield – drum technician
- Avishay Shabat – guitar technician
- Joseph Llanes – photography
- Pamela Hanson – cover photo
- Julian Peploe – artwork

== Chart performance ==
Chart (2014)	Peak position
Australian Albums (ARIA)	73
German Albums (Offizielle Top 100)	69
UK Rock & Metal Albums (OCC)	28
US Billboard 200	33
US Digital Albums (Billboard)	25
US Independent Albums (Billboard)	46
US Top Alternative Albums (Billboard)	4
US Top Rock Albums (Billboard)	8

== Release history ==
Region	Date	Format(s)	Label
United States	21 October 2014	CD; digital download; vinyl	Zuma Rock
