= Mad Love (Bush song) =

Single by Bush

from the album Black and White Rainbows
- Released: 6 February 2017
- Genre: Rock
- Length: 3:30
- Songwriter: Gavin Rossdale
- Producer: Gavin Rossdale

Bush singles chronology
"Loneliness Is A Killer" (2015)	"Mad Love" (2017)	"Lost in You" (2017)

Mad Love is the lead single from Black and White Rainbows, the seventh studio album by British rock band Bush. It was released on 6 February 2017.

== Music ==
=== Lyrics ===
According to an interview in Daily Star on March 17, 2017, Gavin Rossdale has confessed that he will "always love" his ex-wife Gwen Stefani. And he went on to call Gwen his "muse", saying that despite their split, he is still inspired by her. His band's new song Mad Love is dedicated to Gwen. "The song is about forgiveness," Gavin explained to the Daily Star. "To find each other again. Every song I write is a bit about Gwen. She will always be my muse and I will be inspired by her whether we like it or not. And I will always love her, she is the mother of my children."

== Music video ==
The video for Mad Love featured Bush performing the song on a rooftop of a building. There are also shots of Gavin Rossdale in a well-worn red room while belting out lyrics.

== Performances ==
Bush performed Mad Love live on The Voice UK, a British television talent show on which Gavin Rossdale served as a coach.

== Chart ==
Chart (2017)	Peak position
US Mainstream Rock (Billboard)	39
