= Bullet Holes =

Single by Bush

from the album The Kingdom
- Released: 2019
- Genre: Punk rock
- Length: 3:47
- Songwriter(s): Gavin Rossdale
- Producer(s): Gavin Rossdale

Bush singles chronology
"This Is War" (2017)	"Bullet Holes" (2019)	"Flowers on a Grave" (2020)

"Bullet Holes" is the lead single from The Kingdom, the eighth studio album by English rock band Bush. It was featured in the 2019 action film John Wick: Chapter 3 – Parabellum.

== Musical style ==
In allusion to the song's musical content, Rolling Stone detailed "echoy blues guitar riffs" and "seething bass", descending into a "punk" style".

"Bullet Holes" has a strong musical similarity to U2's "Bullet the Blue Sky" (1987).

== Music video ==
The music video for "Bullet Holes" was directed by Jesse Davey.

== Charts ==
Chart (2019)	Peak position
US Rock Airplay (Billboard)	49
