= Flowers on a Grave =

2020 song by Bush

Single by Bush

from the album The Kingdom
- Released: 4 March 2020
- Genre: Rock
- Length: 3:45
- Label: BMG
- Songwriter: Gavin Rossdale
- Producer: Gavin Rossdale

Bush singles chronology
"Bullet Holes" (2019)	"Flowers on a Grave" (2020)	"The Kingdom" (2020)

"Flowers on a Grave" is a song by British rock band Bush. It was released as the second single from their eighth album The Kingdom on 4 March 2020.

== Content ==
=== Style ===
"Flowers on a Grave" was detailed by Blabbermouth to be a "hard-charging lead track". The song is based around electronic undercurrents and heavy guitar textures.

=== Lyrics ===
Gavin Rossdale explained to Louder Sound that "Flowers on a Grave" was "a song about getting to know yourself", and opined that the track "has really found a way to connect with people during this pandemic".

== Reception ==
"Flowers on a Grave" was featured on Loudwire's list "66 Best Rock Songs of 2020".

== Chart ==
Chart (2020)	Peak position
US Mainstream Rock (Billboard)	10
