= The Only Way Out (Bush song) =

Single by Bush

from the album Man on the Run
- Released: 9 September 2014
- Recorded: NRG Recording Studios in North Hollywood, California
- Label: Zuma Rock
- Songwriter: Gavin Rossdale
- Producer: Jay Baumgardner

Bush singles chronology
| "Glycerine (Live)" (2012) | "The Only Way Out" (2014) | "Man on the Run" (2015) |

"The Only Way Out" is a 2014 song by British rock band Bush, released on 9 September 2014, through Zuma Rock Records. Produced by Jay Baumgardner and recorded at NRG Recording Studios in North Hollywood, California, it was the lead single from their sixth album Man on the Run. According to songwriter Gavin Rossdale, the song is "a good gateway into the record ... it gets a bit wider and probably a little darker. This is just the right way in."

== Release ==
"The Only Way Out" was released on 9 September 2014, through Zuma Rock Records.

On 1 October 2014, the music video for "The Only Way Out" premiered on Vevo.

== Artwork ==
Tobias Hutzler is credited with the artwork for "The Only Way Out".

== Chart performance ==
| Chart (2014) | Peak position |
|---|---|
| Canada Rock (Billboard) | 11 |
| US Hot Rock & Alternative Songs (Billboard) | 38 |
| US Rock & Alternative Airplay (Billboard) | 13 |
