= Black and White Rainbows =

Studio album by Bush
- Released: 10 March 2017
- Recorded: 1 March 2016 – 3 March 2017
- Genre: Arena rock; hard rock; pop rock
- Length: 57:42
- Label: Zuma Rock, Caroline
- Producer: Bob Rock (track 9 only), Gavin Rossdale

Bush chronology
Man on the Run (2014)	Black and White Rainbows (2017)	The Kingdom (2020)

Singles from Black and White Rainbows
- 1. "People at War" Released: 20 June 2016; 2. "Mad Love" Released: 6 February 2017; 3. "Lost in You" Released: 24 February 2017; 4. "The Beat of Your Heart" Released: 3 March 2017; 5. "This Is War" Released: 13 November 2017

Black and White Rainbows is the seventh studio album by British alternative rock band Bush, released on 10 March 2017, through Zuma Rock Records and Caroline International. It is the follow-up to the band's 2014 album, Man on the Run, and is the third featuring the lineup of Gavin Rossdale, Robin Goodridge, Chris Traynor and Corey Britz. It is the last album to feature longtime drummer Robin Goodridge, the only member other than Rossdale who had played on every album dating back to their 1994 debut Sixteen Stone which launched the band's career. He was also the only longtime member to rejoin Bush after their hiatus from 2002 to 2010.

== Release ==
=== Album ===
Black and White Rainbows was released on 10 March 2017, through Zuma Rock Records. The album was released in the United Kingdom with the artist credited as "Bush with Gavin Rossdale" and had a sticker promoting The Voice, which Rossdale was a coach on during the show's sixth series. A remastered deluxe edition of the album on 13 October 2017 with a new extended tracklisting including new songs "This is War" and "Alien Language" along with extended versions of "Mad Love" and "Peace-S".

=== Singles ===
"People at War" was released alongside a music video in June 2016, in partnership with the UN Refugee Agency.

The lead single from the album, "Mad Love", was released on 6 February 2017.

"Lost in You" was the second song released from the album, on 24 February 2017.

"The Beat of Your Heart" was the third song released from the album, on 3 March 2017.

== Content ==
=== Musical style ===
Discussing the overall sound on Black and White Rainbows, Henry Yates of LouderSound described the album as having an "electro-tinged pop rock" sound "between U2 and Thirty Seconds To Mars". AllMusic commented that Bush "managed to craft a collection of adult contemporary hard rock" with the record. Spectrum Culture described the album as an arena rock effort.

== Critical reception ==
Professional ratings
Aggregate scores
Source	Rating
Metacritic	49/100
Review scores
Source	Rating
ABC News	4/5 stars
AllMusic	3/5 stars
Classic Rock Magazine	2.5/5 stars
Drowned in Sound	3/10
The Guardian	2/5 stars

Black and White Rainbows received mixed reviews from music critics. At Metacritic, which assigns a normalized rating out of 100 to reviews from mainstream critics, the album has an average score of 49 based on 4 reviews, indicating "mixed or average reviews".

Neil Z. Yeung of AllMusic rated the album three out of five stars, calls it "an interesting piece of the Bush discography", and states that it "hints at a late-era trajectory shift and a reinvigorated spirit for Rossdale and company." In a two out of five star review, The Guardian's Gwilym Mumford claims: "Album number seven sands down what little edge the band once had and buffs their sound to a banal, stadium-rock sheen."

== Track listing ==
All songs written by Gavin Rossdale; "Lost in You" co-written by Dave Stewart.

No.	Title	Length
1.	"Mad Love"	3:30
2.	"Peace-s"	4:25
3.	"Water"	3:29
4.	"Lost in You"	4:17
5.	"Sky Turns Day Glo"	4:22
6.	"Toma mi corazón"	4:04
7.	"All the Worlds Within You"	3:36
8.	"Nurse"	3:50
9.	"The Beat of Your Heart"	3:00
10.	"Dystopia"	2:58
11.	"Ray of Light"	3:09
12.	"Ravens"	3:28
13.	"Nothing But a Car Chase"	3:41
14.	"The Edge of Love"	4:24
15.	"People at War"	5:29
Total length:		57:42

=== Deluxe Edition remaster ===
No.	Title	Length
1.	"This is War" (new song)	4:16
2.	"Nurse"	3:51
3.	"Mad Love" (extended)	3:59
4.	"The Beat of Your Heart"	3:00
5.	"Peace-s" (extended)	4:46
6.	"Toma Mi Corazón"	4:05
7.	"Dystopia"	2:59
8.	"Water"	3:29
9.	"Alien Language" (new song)	3:15
10.	"Lost in You"	4:20
11.	"Sky Turns Day Glo"	4:23
12.	"Ravens"	3:31
13.	"All the Worlds Within You"	3:38
14.	"Ray of Light"	3:09
15.	"Nothing but a Car Chase"	3:41
16.	"The Edge of Love"	4:25
17.	"People at War"	5:29

== Personnel ==
Credits adapted from AllMusic

Bush

- Gavin Rossdale – lead vocals, rhythm guitar
- Chris Traynor – lead guitar
- Corey Britz – bass, backing vocals
- Robin Goodridge – drums

Technical personnel

- John Ewing, Jr. – engineer, mixing
- Neil Krug – art direction, photography
- Stephen Marcussen – mastering
- Bob Rock – producer
- Gavin Rossdale – mixing, producer

== Charts ==
Chart (2017)	Peak position
Belgian Albums (Ultratop Flanders)	173
German Albums (Offizielle Top 100)	85
Scottish Albums (OCC)	48
Swiss Albums (Schweizer Hitparade)	75
UK Albums (OCC)	63
US Independent Albums (Billboard)	21

== Release history ==
Region	Date	Format(s)	Label	Ref.
Worldwide	10 March 2017	CD; Digital download	Zuma Rock	
