= More Than Machines =

Single by Bush

from the album The Art of Survival
- Released: 27 July 2022
- Length: 3:45
- Songwriter: Gavin Rossdale
- Producer: Gavin Rossdale

Bush singles chronology
"Blood River/Quicksand" (2020)	"More Than Machines" (2022)	"Heavy Is the Ocean" (2022)

"More Than Machines" is a song by English band Bush, released as the lead single from their 2022 album The Art of Survival.

One of Bush's most political songs, "More Than Machines" tackles subject matter including artificial intelligence, climate change and women's rights following the overturning of Roe v. Wade in 2022. Alabama-based publication AL.com described the track as a "pro-choice anthem".

== Details ==
"More Than Machines" features electronic beats, and riffs which have been compared to American nu metal band Korn.

Gavin Rossdale told Loudwire that "More Than Machines" was written about what he saw to be the "destruction of women's rights" through anti-abortion laws, the "destruction of the planet" and the rise of artificial intelligence. Discussing his decision to take aim at changes to abortion law, especially the overturning of Roe v. Wade in June 2022, Rossdale explained to Kerrang! that October: "[The overturning] didn’t make any sense to me at all, I'm really lucky to have grown up in London, which is really progressive and mixed and pretty forward-thinking, so things like that in America seem really strange to me. You have these old boys in the Supreme Court, and one woman, telling women about their bodies. And I can’t get my head around that; governments getting involved in the most private and sacred area of a woman's journey."

== Chart ==
Chart (2022)	Peak position
US Mainstream Rock (Billboard)	2
US Alternative Airplay (Billboard)	30
