= Little Things (Bush song) =

Single by Bush

from the album Sixteen Stone
- Released: 31 July 1995
- Recorded: 1994
- Genre: Grunge
- Length: 4:24 (album version); 4:02 (edit)
- Label: Trauma; Interscope
- Songwriter: Gavin Rossdale
- Producers: Clive Langer; Alan Winstanley; Bush

Bush singles chronology
"Everything Zen" (1995)	"Little Things" (1995)	"Comedown" (1995)

"Little Things" is a song by rock band Bush, released to radio in the United States in April 1995 and physically released on 31 July 1995 as the second single from their 1994 debut album, Sixteen Stone.

== Composition ==
In a November 2017 interview with Songfacts, Gavin Rossdale explained the song's inspiration:

The lyrical inspiration was the simple realization of that whole thing about don't be letting the details get you down. I was always feeling encumbered by life and overtaken by life and dwarfed by life, and my feelings and my paranoias and my worries were larger than anything else. So, there was always that pain to try to keep all of those worries at bay. That's just a song about paranoia for the future and paranoia of life. I think it has something to do with trying to be strong in the face of adversity.

== Music video ==
The video was shot throughout January and February 1995 in an old mansion in Long Island, NY, and Los Angeles, and at the band's studio. The video was directed by Matt Mahurin who also directed their previous video for "Everything Zen"

The video cuts between images of a grinning woman wearing black face paint, an albino snake, a fire-eating woman, a man's reflection in a river, and a man kissing a classical or neo-classical statute and then dragging it around with him. This imagery alternates with film of Gavin Rossdale and other band members performing the song.

== Track listing ==
- Enhanced CD Super Single INTDE-95745
  1. "Little Things'"
  2. "Little Things [Live]"
  3. "Bud"
  4. "Everything Zen [Music Video]"
  5. "Little Things [Music Video]"
- AUS CD single 92531 / INTDS95757 (both cardsleeve and jewelcase versions)
  1. "Little Things" - 4:25
  2. "Swim [Live]" - 6:39
  3. "X-Girlfriend" - 0:47

== Charts ==
=== Weekly charts ===
Chart (1995)	Peak position
Australia (ARIA)	177
Canada Rock/Alternative (RPM)	2
UK Singles (Official Charts Company)	184
UK Rock & Metal (Official Charts)	6
US Radio Songs (Billboard)	46
US Alternative Airplay (Billboard)	4
US Mainstream Rock (Billboard)	6

=== Year-end charts ===
Chart (1995)	Position
Canada Rock/Alternative (RPM)	7
