= Comedown (song) =

1995 single by Bush

Single by Bush

from the album Sixteen Stone
- B-side: "Testosterone"; "Revolution Blues" (live)
- Released: August 1995
- Genre: Post-grunge; grunge; hard rock
- Length: 5:26
- Label: Trauma; Interscope; Atlantic
- Songwriter: Gavin Rossdale
- Producers: Clive Langer; Alan Winstanley; Bush

Bush singles chronology
"Little Things" (1995)	"Comedown" (1995)	"Glycerine" (1996)

"Comedown" is a song by British rock band Bush, released in August 1995 as the third single from their debut album, Sixteen Stone (1994).

== Composition ==
Gavin Rossdale wrote the song about an ex-girlfriend, stating, "It was written in the context of half regret, half celebration and just being objective about the situation of coming down from that high and dealing with those intense emotions." In 2017 he added:

I liked the idea of euphoria. But having that euphoria has a comedown. It's inside your brain and just says, 'I'm having the greatest time, and I don't want to stop.' But most of the time, people lose that zone and it changes and you're like, 'No, I didn't want this.' And that's such a common feeling. I watched it being sung every night - it's one of the songs where I can step back and let the people sing. It's the best feeling in the world as a songwriter.

Drummer Robin Goodridge told music publication Modern Drummer that the bass line and drum grooves in "Comedown" were borrowed from a song by English band Massive Attack.

Of the 12 songs featured on Sixteen Stone, "Comedown" was the first to be written, and remains unchanged lyrically from its original form.

== Commercial performance ==
"Comedown" remains one of the band's most commercially successful songs, reaching number one on the Billboard Alternative Songs chart and number two on the Billboard Mainstream Rock Tracks chart in late 1995. The song also gave Bush their first American top 40 hit, reaching number 30 on the Billboard Hot 100 on 4 November 1995.

== Music video ==
The music video was directed by Jake Scott in Los Angeles. Scott used a special "fish eye" lens to film some of the scenes, to give a distorted view as if looking through a peep hole.

== Track listings ==
- Australian CD single
1. "Comedown" (radio edit)
2. "Testosterone" (LP version)
3. "Revolution Blues" (live)

== Charts ==
=== Weekly charts ===
Chart (1995–1996)	Peak position
Australia (ARIA)	45
Canada Rock/Alternative (RPM)	1
US Billboard Hot 100	30
US Alternative Airplay (Billboard)	1
US Mainstream Rock Airplay (Billboard)	2
US Cash Box Top 100	27
US Pop/Alternative Top 20 (Radio & Records)	3

=== Year-end charts ===
Chart (1995)	Position
US Album Rock Tracks (Billboard)	21
US Modern Rock Tracks (Billboard)	3

Chart (1996)	Position
US Mainstream Rock Tracks (Billboard)	76

== Certifications ==
Region	Certification	Certified units/sales
New Zealand (RMNZ)	Gold	15,000^{‡}
^{‡} Sales+streaming figures based on certification alone.

== Cover versions ==
- In 2010, Mono Inc released an EP with "Comedown" on it. "Comedown" was also featured on their Symphonies of Pain compilation album in 2017.
- In 2012, Robert Cole Band released a cover on the album Steel and Glass.
- In 2014, Mayday Parade released a cover for the compilation Punk Goes 90s Vol. 2. It was released as a single.

== Appearances in media ==
- The song appeared in the video game Guitar Hero 5 in addition to Rock Band 3 as downloadable content.
- The song appeared in the TV show Animal Kingdom.
- Along with "Machinehead", "Comedown" appears in the 1996 film Fear. It can be heard over Nicole's second date with David, after he picks her up from school to play billiards.
- Along with "Glycerine", the band performed the song on Saturday Night Live in 1995.
- Pro wrestler Chris Kanyon used an instrumental edit of the song in the last days of World Championship Wrestling in 2001.
- In 2006, CBC used the song in their closing montage of the Stanley Cup Playoffs.
