= Everything Zen =

1995 single by Bush

Single by Bush

from the album Sixteen Stone
- Released: 10 April 1995
- Genre: Grunge; alternative rock; hard rock
- Length: 4:38 (album version); 4:02 (edit)
- Label: Trauma; Interscope
- Songwriter: Gavin Rossdale
- Producers: Clive Langer; Alan Winstanley; Bush

Bush singles chronology
"Bomb" (1994)	"Everything Zen" (1995)	"Little Things" (1995)

Music video
- "Everything Zen" on YouTube

"Everything Zen" is a single by British rock band Bush. The song was released to radio in autumn 1994 before being physically released on 10 April 1995. The single comes from their 1994 debut album, Sixteen Stone. It was the band's first single released under the name Bush, and their second overall.

== Lyrics and music ==
The title of the song may refer to the poem Howl by Allen Ginsberg which includes the phrase "who vanished into nowhere Zen New Jersey." The lyrics "Mickey Mouse has grown up a cow" and "...on sale again" are taken from David Bowie's 1971 song "Life on Mars?". Other references in the song include Tom Waits ("Rain Dogs howl for the century"), Jane's Addiction's "Ted, Just Admit It..." ("there's no sex in your violence"), Alice in Chains' "Would?" ("try to see it once my way"), and the Elvis Presley sighting conspiracy theory ("I don't believe that Elvis is dead").

The song's opening guitar riff has been compared to that of Neil Young's "Rockin' in the Free World" (1989).

== Music video ==
The video was the first video Bush had ever made. The video was directed by Matt Mahurin, who also makes an appearance in the video wearing a mask. Scenes from the video were recreated in the opening credits of the TV series Millennium.

Gavin Rossdale said of the video: "I hadn't even seen that many videos before making this because I never had MTV. I just remember that it felt weird miming with all those people standing around, but you soon get over that. Obviously, this video was hugely important in breaking us in America."

== Release and performance ==
"Everything Zen" was released to radio in the United States in 1994, before the album Sixteen Stone was released. KROQ started playing the song alongside "Little Things" before other radio stations did. As a result, Sixteen Stone, which was scheduled to be released in January 1995, was released in November 1994 instead. Although it did not achieve immediate success, it eventually reached number two on the Billboard Modern Rock Chart, number 5 on the Mainstream Rock Tracks and Canadian Rock/Alternative chart, and number 40 on the Hot 100 Airplay. It failed to hit the Hot 100 that year.

== Track listing ==
European CD single (6544-95794-2) and 12-inch vinyl (A8196T)

1. "Everything Zen" (radio edit)
2. "Bud"
3. "Monkey"
4. "Everything Zen"

== Charts ==
=== Weekly charts ===
Chart (1995)	Peak position
Australia (ARIA)	41
European Alternative Rock (Music & Media)	9
Netherlands (Dutch Top 40 Tipparade)	5
Netherlands (Single Top 100)	45
UK Singles (Official Charts)	84
UK Rock & Metal (Official Charts)	2
US Radio Songs (Billboard)	40
US Alternative Airplay (Billboard)	2
US Mainstream Rock (Billboard)	5

=== Year-end charts ===
Chart (1995)	Position
US Album Rock Tracks (Billboard)	11
US Modern Rock Tracks (Billboard)	17

== Release history ==
Region	Date	Format(s)	Label(s)	Ref.
United States	1994	Radio	Trauma; Interscope	
Australia	10 April 1995	CD; cassette	Trauma; Interscope; Atlantic	
United Kingdom	17 April 1995	12-inch vinyl; CD; cassette	Trauma; Interscope; Atlantic	
