= Sixteen Stone =

1994 studio album by Bush

Studio album by Bush
- Released: 1 November 1994
- Recorded: January 1994
- Studio: Westside (London)
- Genres: Grunge; post-grunge; hard rock
- Length: 52:38
- Labels: Trauma; Interscope
- Producers: Clive Langer; Alan Winstanley; Bush

Bush chronology
Sixteen Stone (1994)	Razorblade Suitcase (1996)

Singles from Sixteen Stone
- 1. "Everything Zen" Released: April 1995; 2. "Little Things" Released: July 1995; 3. "Comedown" Released: August 1995; 4. "Glycerine" Released: January 1996; 5. "Machinehead" Released: April 1996

Sixteen Stone is the debut studio album by English rock band Bush, released on 1 November 1994 in the United States and on 8 May 1995 in the United Kingdom through Trauma and Interscope Records. Featuring a rock sound characterised by guitar distortion and quiet interludes, the album quickly invited comparisons to Seattle grunge bands, particularly the recently disbanded Nirvana. The purported similarities between the band's sound and Nirvana's was the subject of significant media attention. Lyrical themes on the album included adversity and criticism of masculine stereotypes, as well as relationships and terrorism.

Sixteen Stone has been considered the band's most popular album, peaking at number 4 on the US Billboard 200 and boasting numerous successful singles. "Comedown" and "Glycerine" remain two of Bush's biggest hits to date, each reaching number 1 on the US Billboard Modern Rock Tracks chart. "Comedown", "Machinehead", and "Glycerine" were the three songs from the album to enter the US Billboard Hot 100, reaching number 30, number 43, and number 28, respectively. The album was certified 6× Platinum in the United States by the RIAA on 16 April 1997. Although notably less successful in the band's native Britain, the album was nonetheless certified Silver by the British Phonographic Industry. To mark its 20th anniversary, a remastered edition of the album was released on 14 October 2014. Sixteen Stone charted 59th in the Billboard decade-end chart for 1990–1999, and ranked 8th on Guitar World's 2014 list "Superunknown: 50 Iconic Albums That Defined 1994". In 2025, Lauryn Schaffner of Loudwire named the album the best post-grunge release of 1994. That same year, she said it was the band's best album.

== Recording and background ==
The seeds of the album were sown prior to Rossdale, previously of the band Midnight, first meeting future Bush bandmate Nigel Pulsford in 1991, when Rossdale wrote "Comedown", the first song he had ever written by himself, which would later reach Number 1 on the Billboard Alternative Airplay charts.

Sixteen Stone was recorded in 1994 at Westway Records in London, and produced by Clive Langer and Alan Winstanley. In 1999, Gavin Rossdale explained that the decision to have Langer produce the record was brought about by Langer simply being English, and by his work co-writing the song "Shipbuilding" with Elvis Costello. Rossdale initially wanted Steve Albini to work on Sixteen Stone. Albini would engineer the band's next album Razorblade Suitcase. Guitarist Nigel Pulsford told BBC Cymru Wales in 2009 that the decision to have Langer and Winstanley work on the record was due to sensitivities around the band sounding too American; Pulsford said "it became apparent that we had a definite American bent to our sound which is why we choose [Langer and Winstanley] to produce our first album in the hope that they would make us sound more British". The album was originally scheduled to be released in January 1995, but was released 2 months earlier as radio stations began playing "Everything Zen" and "Little Things".

Guitarist Nigel Pulsford's father and Rossdale's stepfather died around the time the album was recorded. Sixteen Stone is dedicated to both.

Some time prior to release, the band, known previously as Future Primitive, became known as Bush after Carson convinced the band that a shortened name would be more suitable for a CD. Prior to the name-change the song "Bomb" (which would later appear on the album) had been released as a single under the "Future Primitive" name, as had an untitled promo version of the album itself. David Carson designed the album artwork and packaging for the album. Sixteen Stone was delivered to Trauma Records in early April 1994, and released on 1 November that year through the label. Rossdale has stated that the reason Sixteen Stone's release through Trauma was delayed was the label's distributor, Hollywood Records, opining that the record contained "no singles" and "no album tracks".

== Composition ==
=== Style and influences ===
The music of Sixteen Stone has been characterized variously as grunge, post-grunge, and hard rock, and has been compared with the music of 1990s Seattle-based bands including Nirvana, Pearl Jam, Alice in Chains and Soundgarden; the song "Bomb" in particular invited a description of "Nirvana-approximating" from Stereogum. In relation to the reputed similarities between Sixteen Stone and Nirvana, Gavin Rossdale told Guitar World in 1997 that he believed the influence was only obvious on the song "Little Things", commenting "you've got one chord progression and a kind of different rhythm in the chorus, which is the same effect you get with Nirvana" further commenting "if you listen to "Smells like Teen Spirit" and then listen to [the Pixies] "Debaser", it's the same thing". Other influences noted by critics included the musical similarities between "Everything Zen" and Neil Young's "Rockin' in the Free World" (1989) and the resemblance borne between the riff on "Body" and that on the Soundgarden song "Rusty Cage" (1991).

The styles on the record include the rock ballad of "Glycerine", the Ramones-indebted punk rock of "X-Girlfriend", and what Stereogum described as "groove-grunge" on "Comedown" and "Body", the former featuring a bassline inspired by Massive Attack and the latter being described by SoundVapours as "the perfect mix" of Black Sabbath and Soundgarden.

Reflecting on the influences on Sixteen Stone, Gavin Rossdale cited seeing bands including Jane's Addiction, My Bloody Valentine and Soul Asylum as key formative experiences and stated "…I liked the performance of the American bands a lot, [...] that all just inspired me, and I put it in a melting pot and out came Sixteen Stone.” Drummer Robin Goodridge told the publication Modern Drummer in 1996 that Sixteen Stone features percussion informed by the styles John Bonham of Led Zeppelin, Billy Cobham and Keith Moon of The Who.

=== Lyrics ===
The lyrical content of Sixteen Stone revolved around a variety of themes. "Testosterone" conveyed a take-down of machismo, while Stereogum analyzed "Monkey" to be a "sardonic statement about rock stardom" and to "attack the British sellout angle". "Bomb" is an anti-war song; Rossdale told American Songwriter in 2011 that the song had been "written about the Irish IRA presence where I grew up", further explaining to Us Weekly in September 2023 that the song "is about growing up in the shadow of the IRA and the Protestants, the Orange Parade march, and things. Where I grew up in North London, there were these bombed shopping centres and buses, and people died, and it was the real thing." Other songs related to personal challenges, including "Little Things" which Rossdale claimed was written about "trying to be strong in the face of adversity".

== Reception ==
=== Critical reception ===
Professional ratings
Review scores
Source	Rating
AllMusic	4.5/5 stars
Entertainment Weekly	B−
The Guardian	2/5 stars
Q	3/5 stars
The Rolling Stone Album Guide	3.5/5 stars
The Village Voice	B−

Sixteen Stone received mostly positive feedback from music critics. Q wrote that Bush "make a carefully honed post-grunge sound that fits perfectly alongside American counterparts like Stone Temple Pilots or Live." In a four-and-a-half stars out of five review, Stephen Thomas Erlewine of AllMusic calls their sound impressive, but states that the band sounds too much like Seattle rockers Nirvana and Pearl Jam. Robert Christgau was more critical in The Village Voice, regarding it as a "not altogether unmusical howl of male pain" that glorified "despair".

=== Accolades ===
In April 2014, Rolling Stone placed the album at number thirty-nine on their 1994: The 40 Best Records From Mainstream Alternative's Greatest Year list. A month later, Loudwire placed Sixteen Stone at number eight on its "10 Best Hard Rock Albums of 1994" list. In July 2014 Guitar World placed the album on its "Superunknown: 50 Iconic Albums That Defined 1994" list.

== Remaster ==
Around the album's 20th anniversary, a remastered edition of its original recordings was released. When asked about also remixing the album for the anniversary edition, Rossdale stated "I did attempt to remix ... but it's really, like, you just can't do that. You can't mess with stuff. Those mixes, every single level of those songs is just ingrained in my DNA as it's probably in anybody's DNA who knows it. It just sounds really weird when you mess with it."

== Track listing ==
All tracks are written by Gavin Rossdale

No.	Title	Length
1.	"Everything Zen"	4:38
2.	"Swim"	4:56
3.	"Bomb"	3:23
4.	"Little Things"	4:24
5.	"Comedown"	5:27
6.	"Body"	5:43
7.	"Machinehead"	4:16
8.	"Testosterone"	4:20
9.	"Monkey"	4:01
10.	"Glycerine"	4:27
11.	"Alien"	6:34
12.	"X-Girlfriend"	0:45
Total length:		52:53

Notes

- Early pressings of the album do not list "Alien" on the back cover (there is a blank space where the title should be). "Monkey" is also missing from the inside cover, but both songs have lyrics printed and appear on the album.
- Subsequent pressings also include an alternate version of "Comedown" and a second CD of live tracks, "Swim", "Alien", "Bomb", and "Little Things". The bonus "Comedown" track is Rossdale singing and playing guitar with more effects. This version is also slower-paced, has violins added and has no drums.

== Personnel ==
Bush

- Gavin Rossdale – lead vocals, rhythm guitar
- Nigel Pulsford – lead guitar, backing vocals
- Dave Parsons – bass
- Robin Goodridge – drums

Additional musicians

- Caroline Dale – cello
- Gavyn Wright – violin, viola
- Vincas Bundza – harmonica
- Jasmine Lewis – backing vocals
- Alessandro Vittorio Tateo – backing vocals
- Winston – backing vocals

Technical personnel

- Bush – producer, engineer
- Clive Langer – producer, engineer, mixing
- David J. Holman – mixing
- Paul Palmer – mixing
- Danton Supple – assistant engineer
- Robert Vosgien – mastering
- Alan Winstanley – producer, engineer, mixing
- Debra Burley – co-ordination
- Jackie Holland – co-ordination
- Paul Cohen – photography, cover photo
- Mark Lebon – photography
- Gillian Spitchuk – paintings
- Mixed at Cactus Studio Hollywood

== Chart performance ==
Sixteen Stone first entered the Billboard 200 at number 187 for week ending 28 January 1995, and eventually peaked at number four. In 2010 the album's US sales passed the six million mark.

=== Weekly charts ===
Chart (1994–1996)	Peak position
Australian Albums (ARIA)	5
Belgian Albums (Ultratop Flanders)	14
Canada Albums (The Record)	4
Dutch Albums (Album Top 100)	20
Finnish Albums (Suomen virallinen lista)	35
German Albums (Offizielle Top 100)	68
New Zealand Albums (RMNZ)	2
Scottish Albums (Official Charts)	82
UK Albums (Official Charts)	42
UK Rock & Metal Albums (Official Charts)	6
US Billboard 200	4
US Top Catalog Albums (Billboard)	3

=== Year-end charts ===
Chart (1995)	Position
US Billboard 200	37

Chart (1996)	Position
Australian Albums (ARIA)	18
Canadian Albums (RPM)	10
New Zealand Albums (RMNZ)	14
US Billboard 200	11

Chart (1997)	Position
Canadian Hard Rock Albums (Nielsen Soundscan)	14

=== Decade-end charts ===
Chart (1990–1999)	Position
US Billboard 200	59

== Certifications ==
Region	Certification	Certified units/sales
Australia (ARIA)	2× Platinum	140,000^{^}
Canada (Music Canada)	8× Platinum	800,000^{‡}
New Zealand (RMNZ)	2× Platinum	30,000^{^}
United Kingdom (BPI)	Silver	60,000^{^}
United States (RIAA)	6× Platinum	6,000,000^{^}
^{^} Shipments figures based on certification alone.^{‡} Sales+streaming figures based on certification alone.

== Bibliography ==
- Anderson, Kyle (2007). Accidental Revolution: The Story of Grunge. Macmillan. ISBN 978-0-312-35819-8.
- Klosterman, Chuck (2007). Fargo Rock City: A Heavy Metal Odyssey in Rural North Dakota. Simon and Schuster. ISBN 978-1-4165-8952-5.
