= Machinehead (song) =

1996 single by Bush

Single by Bush

from the album Sixteen Stone
- Released: April 1996
- Studio: Westside (London, England)
- Genre: Post-grunge; grunge; alternative rock
- Length: 4:16
- Label: Interscope; Trauma; MCA
- Songwriter: Gavin Rossdale
- Producers: Clive Langer; Alan Winstanley; Bush

Bush singles chronology
"Glycerine" (1996)	"Machinehead" (1996)	"Swallowed" (1996)

"Machinehead" is a song by English rock band Bush, released in 1996 as the fifth and final single from their 1994 debut album, Sixteen Stone. In 2024, the staff of Consequence included the song on their list of "50 Kick-Butt Post-Grunge Songs We Can Get Behind".

== Reception ==
"Machinehead" reached No. 43 on the US Billboard Hot 100 on 4 May 1996. It reached No. 4 on both the Billboard Modern Rock Tracks and Mainstream Rock Tracks charts. The song was nominated for Best Video from a Film at the 1996 MTV Music Video Awards but lost; however, it did win the MTV Movie Award for Best Song from a Movie at the 1996 MTV Movie Awards.

== Music video ==
The music video was directed by Shawn Mortensen in London and Portsmouth. Sections of Shepherd's Bush, where the band members used to live, can be seen in the video. Gavin Rossdale's dog Winston is also in the video.

== Track listings ==
- US CD single
1. "Machinehead" – 4:20
2. "Comedown" (acoustic)" – 4:24
3. "X-Girlfriend" – 0:44
- UK limited-edition CD single
1. "Machinehead"
2. "Bud"
3. "Solomon's Bones"
- UK 10-inch vinyl
1. "Machinehead"
2. "Comedown [Acoustic]"
3. "Solomon's Bones"

== Charts ==
=== Weekly charts ===
Chart (1996)	Peak position
Canada Top Singles (RPM)	40
Canada Rock/Alternative (RPM)	1
Quebec Airplay (ADISQ)	50
Scottish Singles Sales (Official Charts)	49
UK Singles (Official Charts)	48
UK Rock & Metal (Official Charts)	3
US Billboard Hot 100	43
US Alternative Airplay (Billboard)	4
US Mainstream Rock Airplay (Billboard)	4
US Cash Box Top 100	38

=== Year-end charts ===
Chart (1996)	Position
Canada Rock/Alternative (RPM)	9
US Mainstream Rock Tracks (Billboard)	13
US Modern Rock Tracks (Billboard)	9

== Certifications ==
Region	Certification	Certified units/sales
New Zealand (RMNZ)	Gold	15,000^{‡}
^{‡} Sales+streaming figures based on certification alone.

== In popular culture ==
The song is used as the entry theme for the Columbus Blue Jackets hockey team. Since 2023, the song has been used as the theme song for AEW's All In wrestling pay-per-view events.
