= Bush (British band) =

British rock band

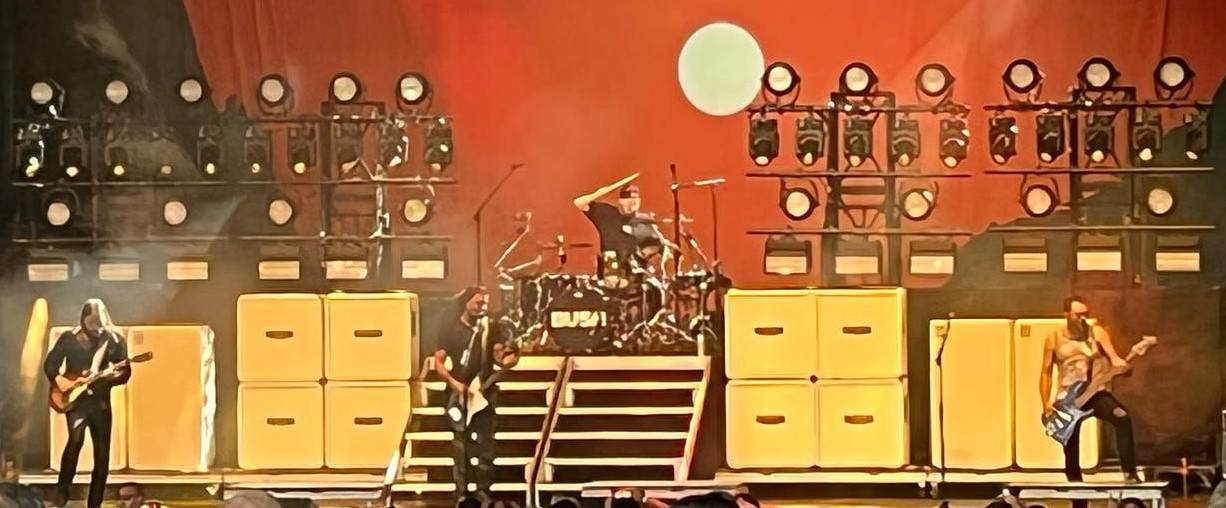
- Bush performing in 2022. From left to right: Chris Traynor, Gavin Rossdale, Nik Hughes and Corey Britz.

Background information
- Also known as: Bush^{x}; Future Primitive; Bush with Gavin Rossdale
- Origin: London, England
- Genres: Post-grunge; grunge; hard rock; alternative rock
- Works: Discography
- Years active: 1992–2002; 2010–present
- Labels: Entertainment One; Kirtland; SPV; Atlantic; Trauma; Interscope; Zuma Rock
- Spinoffs: Institute
- Members: Gavin Rossdale; Chris Traynor; Corey Britz; Nik Hughes
- Past members: Nigel Pulsford; Dave Parsons; Robin Goodridge
- Website: bushofficial.com

Bush are an English rock band formed in London in 1992. As of 2026, their lineup consists of lead vocalist and rhythm guitarist Gavin Rossdale, lead guitarist Chris Traynor, bassist Corey Britz, and drummer Nik Hughes.

In 1994, Bush found immediate success outside the UK with the release of their debut album, Sixteen Stone, which is certified six times multi-platinum by the RIAA. Bush have had numerous top ten singles on the Billboard rock charts and one No. 1 album with Razorblade Suitcase in 1996. The band broke up in 2002 but reformed in 2010, and have released six albums since then: The Sea of Memories (2011), Man on the Run (2014), Black and White Rainbows (2017), The Kingdom (2020), The Art of Survival (2022) and I Beat Loneliness (2025).

== History ==
=== Formation and Sixteen Stone (1992–1995) ===
After leaving his band Midnight, Gavin Rossdale met former King Blank guitarist Nigel Pulsford at a Wembley performance by Baby Animals opening for Bryan Adams in November 1991. The two musicians became friends over a shared appreciation for several artists, including Big Black, the Fall, Pixies, and the Velvet Underground. They formed a new band which they called Future Primitive. Describing the early sound of the group, one British record label executive said years later, "They weren't what they are today – they were a little like the more commercial side of INXS". To complete the lineup, the pair recruited bassist Dave Parsons, and drummer Robin Goodridge joined in mid-1993 shortly before Bush were signed. While still known as Future Primitive, the band released the song "Bomb", later to be featured on the band's debut, as a single through Rossdale's own Mad Dog Winston Records. Rossdale's goal was for Bush to sign with 4AD because of his love for their bands Cocteau Twins, Pixies and Throwing Muses.

Bush, 2001. L-R: Nigel Pulsford, Robin Goodridge, Gavin Rossdale, Dave Parsons.

In 1993, the band was signed by Rob Kahane, who had a distribution deal with Disney's Hollywood Records. The band completed recording its debut album Sixteen Stone in early 1994. However, the death of Disney executive Frank G. Wells eliminated a supporter for Kahane, and executives at Hollywood deemed Bush's album unacceptable for release. Consequently, the bandmates took jobs performing menial labour. Interscope Records ultimately decided to release the album, and at the end of 1994, Kahane sent an advance copy of the album to a friend at influential Los Angeles radio station KROQ-FM, which added the song "Everything Zen" to its rotation.

On the Billboard charts (North America), Sixteen Stone peaked at No. 4 on the Heatseekers and Billboard 200 charts. The album spawned two Top 40 singles. After about six months of promotion for Sixteen Stone, the album began to sell well, once "Comedown" and "Glycerine" struck America. Additionally, "Little Things" and "Machinehead" both charted well in North America.

In Canada, the band were initially forced to release Sixteen Stone under the name Bush^{X}, as the 1970s Canadian band Bush still held the rights to the name Bush in the Canadian market. The dispute arose after the British band's lawyers threatened to intervene to prevent the Canadian band from reissuing its 1970 album, although it was entirely between the bands' lawyers as Rossdale and Domenic Troiano, the leader of the Canadian band, both expressed a willingness to negotiate a solution. In 1997, after the band's second album Razorblade Suitcase also bore the X, Rossdale and Troiano directly negotiated an agreement under which the British band were allowed to drop the X in exchange for donating $20,000 each to the Starlight Foundation and the Canadian Music Therapy Trust Fund. Both Sixteen Stone and Razorblade Suitcase were then reissued without the X.

=== Razorblade Suitcase (1996–1998) ===
In late 1996 Bush released the first single "Swallowed" from their second album titled Razorblade Suitcase. The song spent seven weeks on top of the Modern Rock Tracks chart. This was followed by single "Greedy Fly". The album hit number 1 in America and placed high in many European countries. Bush later released the remix album Deconstructed. The album saw Bush re-arranging their songs into dance and techno stylings. The album went platinum less than a year after release.

=== The Science of Things (1999–2000) ===
Following the completion of touring, Rossdale went into seclusion in Ireland, where he worked on material for the group's next album, periodically sending demo tapes of his works in progress to his bandmates. The group finally convened to record in London in August 1998, where the band reteamed with Sixteen Stone producers Clive Langer and Alan Winstanley.

The release of The Science of Things was stymied by a court battle between the band and Trauma Records. The case was settled in early 1999 and the album was finally released that October. The Science of Things was a major departure in several forms from Bush's first two albums. Like the multi-platinum successes of Bush's first two albums, this album also reached platinum status. Also, while the band's previous albums were strongly influenced by grunge, The Science of Things featured some electronic music influences in addition to the sound defined by Bush's earlier work. For example, although lead single "The Chemicals Between Us" had a prominent guitar riff, it also had many electronic elements usually found in dance music. Although the album had a few hit songs, it failed to chart in the top 10.

The band's performance at Woodstock '99, however, helped The Science of Things achieve platinum status despite its slow start. Three singles were released from The Science of Things, most notably "The Chemicals Between Us", which spent five weeks at No. 1 on the Modern Rock Tracks and peaked at No. 67 on the US Hot 100. "Warm Machine" was the second single released. "Letting the Cables Sleep", the third single, reached No. 4 on the Modern Rock Tracks and also received considerable airplay, and appeared in an episode of the medical drama series ER.

Despite their success in the US (especially in the mid-1990s), the band are considerably less popular in the UK and they have enjoyed only marginal success there.

=== Golden State and breakup (2001–2002) ===
In October 2001, now on the Atlantic Records record label, Bush released its next album, Golden State. While the album attempted to return to the simple, catchy sound of the band's debut, it failed to achieve the same commercial success as the band's previous releases. Several singles were released, most notably the hit "The People That We Love (Speed Kills)", but none were mainstream successes. The album was the band's least successful, selling only 380,000 copies in the US. "The People That We Love (Speed Kills)" was used in the game Need for Speed: Hot Pursuit 2. In January 2002, Pulsford retired after the release of Golden State to spend more time with his family. Chris Traynor filled in for him for the subsequent tour, which would turn out to be Bush's last for eight years. Due to declining record sales and a lack of support from Atlantic Records, Bush disbanded in 2002. In 2005, a greatest hits album called The Best of '94–'99 and a live album called Zen X Four were released.

=== Post-breakup (2003–2010) ===
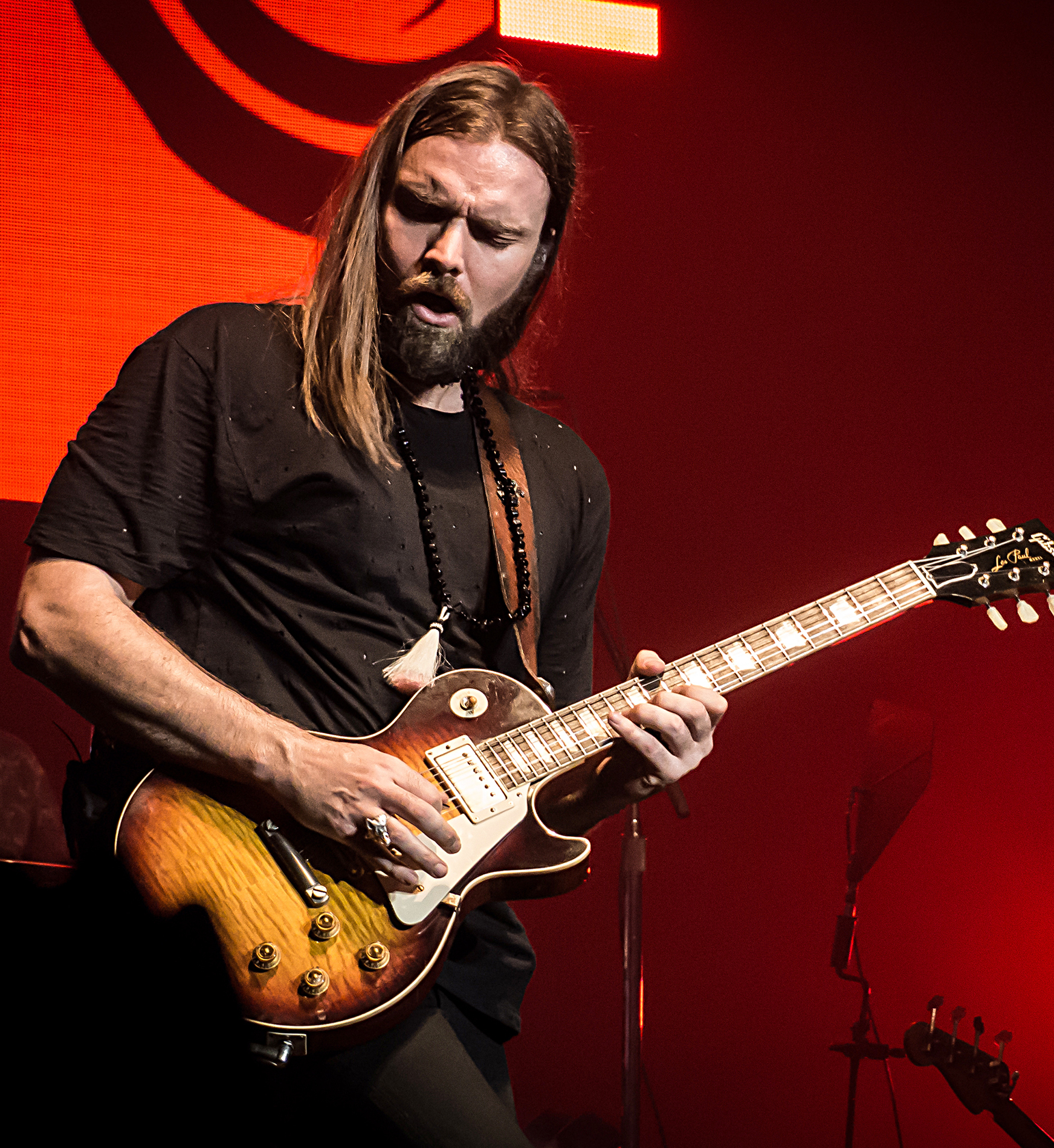
Guitarist Chris Traynor performing with Bush in 2016

Gavin Rossdale formed a new band, Institute, in 2004, serving as their lead vocalist and guitarist, just as in Bush. Chris Traynor also joined the band, as lead guitarist. In addition to playing in Institute, Traynor also joined the reunited metal band Helmet in 2004 on bass; he quit the band in 2006. Institute released one album, Distort Yourself, but failed to achieve much commercial success in spite of opening for U2's Vertigo Tour at some shows. Institute broke up in 2006 and Rossdale then embarked on a solo career. In 2007, he covered the John Lennon song "Mind Games" for the Lennon tribute album Instant Karma: The Amnesty International Campaign to Save Darfur. His first solo album, Wanderlust, supported by leading single "Love Remains the Same", was released in June 2008. Rossdale also ventured into acting, appearing in the films Zoolander, Little Black Book, The Game of Their Lives, Constantine, How to Rob a Bank and others.

Robin Goodridge recorded with the British rock band Elyss in 2004, although they have not released any new material since. In 2006, Goodridge began drumming for indie rock band Spear of Destiny, and appeared on their 2007 album, Imperial Prototype. During the summer of 2008, he toured the UK with British rock band Stone Gods after their current drummer Ed Graham reportedly fell ill. On 29 July it was announced that Graham had left the band and on 6 October 2008, the band's website announced that Goodridge had joined the band. Nigel Pulsford spent most of his time since leaving Bush raising his children with his wife. In an interview with Blender, Gavin Rossdale admitted that the likelihood of a Bush reunion was "very high". He then added "quite high". In a November 2008 interview, Rossdale revealed that he had tried to contact the other members of Bush, "I reached out to them".

=== Reunion and The Sea of Memories (2010–2013) ===
On 22 June 2010, it was announced that Bush would play their first show in eight years at the second-annual Epicenter Music Festival in Fontana, California on 25 September 2010. A new album, then-titled Everything Always Now, was also announced as well as a new single "Afterlife". Founding members Nigel Pulsford and Dave Parsons both decided not to rejoin the band.

Pulsford's and Parsons' successors were previous touring member Chris Traynor and Corey Britz, former bassist for The Calling, respectively. The new line-up played seven shows in 2010, performing songs from Bush's previous four albums as well as a new song, "Afterlife".

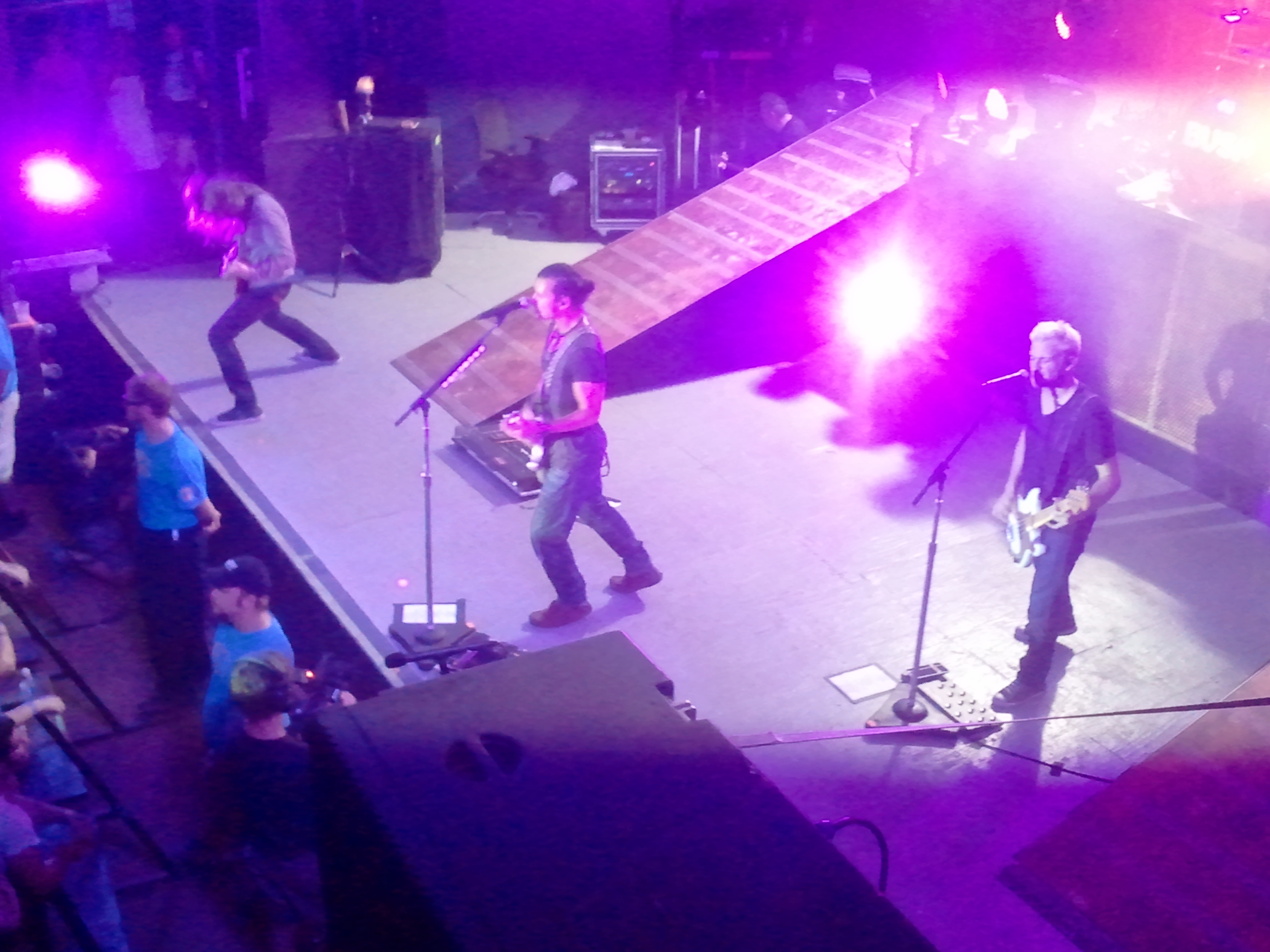
Bush performing in 2011

Gavin announced on radio that their new album had been named The Sea of Memories and was released in September and managed to peak at No. 18 on the Billboard Top 200. The album's first single, "The Sound of Winter" was released in July 2011 and reached number one on the Billboard Alternative Songs chart. On 19 November 2011, Bush performed a live set for "Guitar Center Sessions" on DirecTV. The episode included an interview with program host, Nic Harcourt. Their song "Into The Blue" was featured on The Avengers soundtrack album released on 1 May 2012. They toured with Nickelback on their Here and Now Tour.

=== Man on the Run (2014–2016) ===
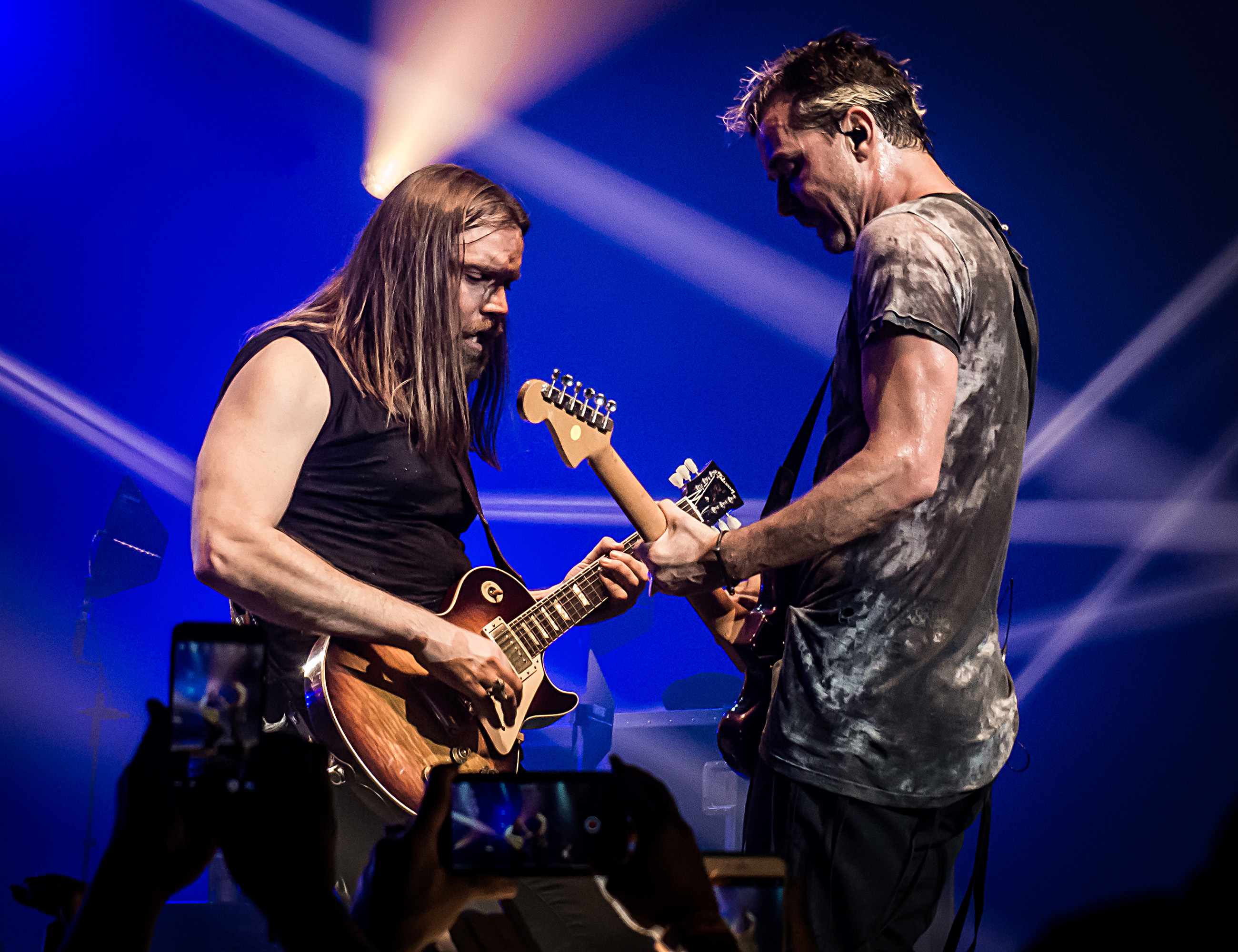
Bush performing in 2016

On 26 March 2014, it was reported that Bush had begun recording their sixth studio album with producer Nick Raskulinecz. Gavin Rossdale announced on 18 August 2014 that the new album, Man on the Run, was available for pre-order in both digital and deluxe edition CD form. A day later, the band revealed that the lead single from the album would be "The Only Way Out". In November 2014 the band announced tour dates for the early months of 2015 beginning on 30 January. In June 2016, Bush released a music video for the new song "People At War".

=== Black and White Rainbows (2017–2019) ===
In January 2017, it was reported that Bush had mastered and completed work on their seventh studio album. On 6 February 2017, the band announced the title, release date of 10 March 2017, and track listing for their seventh studio album, Black and White Rainbows. The lead single from the album, "Mad Love", was released the same day.

On 2 April 2018 a tour of the United States of America, called Revolution 3 Tour, was announced for the summer. They performed as co-headliners with Stone Temple Pilots and The Cult.

Rossdale also revealed that he was working on some material called "heavier" than the recent productions in anticipation of a forthcoming band album.

=== The Kingdom (2019–2022) ===
In May 2019, Bush set The Mind Plays Tricks on You as the title of their new studio album, tentatively due in early 2020.

Drummer Robin Goodridge departed from the band in 2019. With Goodridge's departure, Rossdale became the only original member of Bush remaining in the band.

On 10 May 2019, it was announced that a song, "Bullet Holes", would feature in the film John Wick: Chapter 3 – Parabellum. The song and music video were released on 17 May 2019. Rossdale claimed in late May that the new album, featuring songwriting from Tyler Bates, was influenced by Bush's presence on music festivals dominated by primarily metal bands, and that he had been specifically listening to System of a Down during the writing process for the new album. During the summer of 2019 Bush toured the US with Our Lady Peace and LĪVE.

On 3 March 2020 the band released a new single, "Flowers on a Grave" and announced their new album was re-titled The Kingdom. The album was released on 17 July 2020.

=== The Art of Survival and Loaded: The Greatest Hits 1994–2023 (2022–2025) ===
On 7 March 2022, Bush announced a United States tour with Alice in Chains and Breaking Benjamin, to run from August to October.

On 27 July 2022, Bush announced that their ninth studio album, The Art of Survival, would be released on 7 October, and released the lead single, "More Than Machines". The second single, "Heavy Is the Ocean", was released on 16 September.

On 5 September 2023, Blabbermouth reported that Bush were to issue a greatest hits compilation later that year, the first to feature any of their post-2010 reunion material and Bush's second overall. The band announced an accompanying single, "Nowhere to Go But Everywhere", which was released on 22 September. On the same day, Bush revealed the title of the new compilation, Loaded: The Greatest Hits 1994-2023 and announced a promotional US tour.

Blabbermouth reported in early December 2023 that Rossdale had confirmed he was already "7 songs into another [Bush] record", which Rossdale hoped to release in early 2024.

It was announced in August 2024 that Bush would release an EP, scheduled for release that September. Although the EP, titled Loads of Remixes, featured no new original content, it consisted of remixed versions of past Bush hits. The release was preceded in late July 2024 by a remixed edition of "Glycerine" created by bass player Corey Britz and titled "Corey's Bedroom Mix", and a version of "Swallowed" remixed in collaboration with Queens of the Stone Age bassist Michael Shuman's side project GLU.

=== I Beat Loneliness (2024–present) ===
Rossdale confirmed on 2 September 2024 that a new Bush studio album had been recorded.

On 2 January 2025, Gavin Rossdale set the title for the tenth Bush studio release as I Beat Loneliness, scheduled for release that year. Bush will tour in April and May of 2026 with Mammoth..

The album I Beat Loneliness was released on July 18, 2025 and received mostly favorable reviews.

== Musical style and influences ==
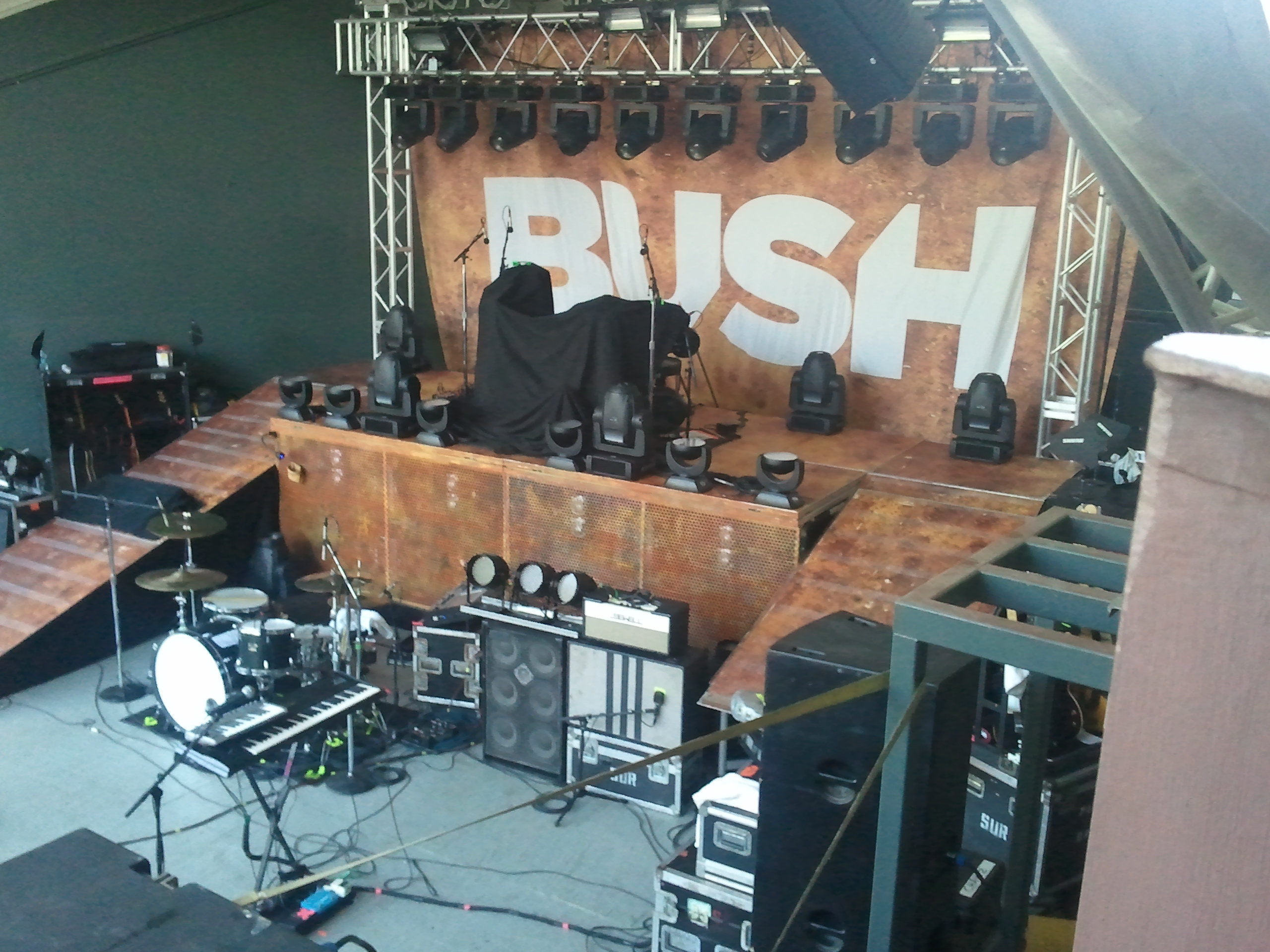
Bush stage before playing on 17 August 2011, Austin, Texas

Bush have been described as grunge, post-grunge, alternative rock, and hard rock. One of the first bands to be described as post-grunge, Bush were labeled almost pejoratively as such. Matt Diehl of Rolling Stone described Bush as "the most successful and shameless mimics of Nirvana's music". In the book Fargo Rock City: A Heavy Metal Odyssey in Rural North Dakota, Chuck Klosterman wrote, "Bush was a good band who just happened to signal the beginning of the end; ultimately, they would become the grunge Warrant". In the book Accidental Revolution: The Story of Grunge, Kyle Anderson wrote about Bush's album Sixteen Stone, writing:

"The twelve songs on Sixteen Stone sound exactly like what grunge is supposed to sound like, while the whole point of grunge was that it didn't really sound like anything, including itself. Just consider how many different bands and styles of music have been shoved under the "grunge" header in this discography alone, and you realize that grunge is probably the most ill-defined genre of music in history."

Bush have noted Nirvana's music as a key influence in their work, but remained insistent that their style is original. Talking to The Morning Call in February 1996, lead guitarist Nigel Pulsford remarked "Nirvana was a big influence. They acted as a catalyst, put the guitar band back in vogue and inspired us to perform". Of the similarities in the music of the two acts, Gavin Rossdale told Rolling Stone that he "hoped" there was an element of Nirvana in Bush but also that felt he "had [his] own thing". In 2011, Rossdale named the Pixies as "the most influential band" to him; indeed, founding members Pulsford and Rossdale became friends in part over a shared interest in the Pixies. Rossdale also acknowledged Alice in Chains as a major influence in his formative days as a rock musician, in particular the song "Man in the Box" (1990), which he described as "a pivotal song for me as a songwriter and a young musician trying to figure out my own aesthetic". In addition, members of Bush have cited artists including The Beatles, Big Black, David Bowie, Bob Dylan, Fugazi, PJ Harvey, Hole, Hüsker Dü, Jane's Addiction, the Jesus Lizard, My Bloody Valentine, Led Zeppelin, Tom Petty, The Replacements, Sex Pistols, Smashing Pumpkins, Sonic Youth, Soul Asylum, Soundgarden, and Neil Young as influential or inspirational.

== Band members ==
=== Current ===
- Gavin Rossdale – lead vocals, rhythm guitar (1992–2002, 2010–present)
- Chris Traynor – lead guitar (2002, 2010–present), backing vocals (2002, 2019–2020)
- Corey Britz – bass, backing vocals (2010–present)
- Nik Hughes – drums (2019–present)

=== Former ===
- Robin Goodridge – drums (1992–2002, 2010–2019)
- Dave Parsons – bass (1992–2002)
- Nigel Pulsford – lead guitar, backing vocals (1992–2002)

==== Touring ====
- Sacha Puttnam – keyboards, piano, backing vocals (1999-2002)
- Sibyl Buck – bass (2012, 2013)

== Discography ==
- Sixteen Stone (1994)
- Razorblade Suitcase (1996)
- The Science of Things (1999)
- Golden State (2001)
- The Sea of Memories (2011)
- Man on the Run (2014)
- Black and White Rainbows (2017)
- The Kingdom (2020)
- The Art of Survival (2022)
- I Beat Loneliness (2025)

== Awards and nominations ==
American Music Awards

Year	Nominated work	Award	Result
1997	Bush	Favorite Alternative Group	Nominated
1998	Bush	Favorite Alternative Group	Won

BMI Pop Awards

Year	Nominated work	Award	Result	Ref.
2001	"The Chemicals Between Us"	Award-Winning Song	Won	

Grammy Awards

Year	Nominated work	Award	Result
1998	"Swallowed"	Best Hard Rock Performance	Nominated

MTV Video Music Awards

Year	Nominated work	Award	Result
1996	"Glycerine"	Viewer's Choice	Won
1996	"Glycerine"	Best Alternative Video	Nominated
1996	"Machinehead"	Best Video from a Movie	Nominated

MTV Movie Awards

Year	Nominated work	Award	Result
1997	"Machinehead"	Best Song from a Movie	Won
1998	"Mouth"	Best Song from a Movie	Nominated

Pollstar Concert Industry Awards

Year	Nominated work	Award	Result	Ref.
1996	Sixteen Stone Tour	Best New Rock Artist Tour	Nominated	
1996	Sixteen Stone Tour	Small Hall Tour Of The Year	Nominated	
1997	Sixteen Stone Tour	Most Creative Tour Package	Nominated	
