= Glycerine (song) =

1996 single by Bush

Single by Bush

from the album Sixteen Stone
- B-side: "Solomon's Bones"; "Alien" (LP version)
- Released: January 1996
- Studio: Westside (London, England)
- Genre: Alternative rock; hard rock; grunge
- Length: 4:26
- Label: Trauma; Interscope; Atlantic
- Songwriter: Gavin Rossdale
- Producers: Clive Langer; Alan Winstanley; Bush

Bush singles chronology
"Comedown" (1995)	"Glycerine" (1996)	"Machinehead" (1996)

Music video
- "Glycerine" on YouTube

"Glycerine" is a ballad by English rock band Bush. It was released to radio in November 1995 as the fourth single from their debut album, Sixteen Stone (1994) and then released commercially in January 1996. "Glycerine" was a hit single throughout Europe, Australia and North America and remains a signature song for the band.

A parody of the song, re-titled "Margerine", is prominently featured in The Simpsons episode "That '90s Show".

== Composition ==
Gavin Rossdale wrote the song in 1993, about his then-girlfriend, Suze DeMarchi, as stated in an interview with Howard Stern. He wrote it in his London flat, feeling that there was an ancient, mystical element to the song as it was coming together. He told Entertainment Weekly in 2017 that "I was like a conduit. Something about it was bigger than anything we were doing." Rossdale found that the song was more sophisticated than his previous work, and he needed to check with his bandmates to make sure he hadn't inadvertently played an existing song.

The single includes a previously unreleased B-side, "Solomon's Bones", which was recorded on 7 November 1995 at River Studios, London and engineered by Joel Monger.

== Music video ==
The music video for "Glycerine" was shot in a very short time period when the band was on tour in the United States. The video was shot so quickly because the band's visas had expired. Though simple and unadorned, the video was highly acclaimed and won several awards, including the MTV Video Music Award - Viewer's Choice as well nominated for Best Alternative Video at the 1996 MTV Video Music Awards. The music video was directed by Kevin Kerslake and shot in Atlanta, Georgia on 2 October 1995. Portions were also shot in Worcester, Massachusetts on 19 August 1995.

== Track listing ==
1. "Glycerine"
2. "Solomon's Bones"
3. "Alien" [LP Version]

== Commercial performance ==
Following the album's third single, "Comedown", "Glycerine" shared equal success. Like "Comedown", it reached number one on the Modern Rock Tracks chart for two weeks, in December 1995. It is also the band's biggest pop hit to date, peaking at number 28 on the Billboard Hot 100 on 24 February 1996. The song won the Viewer's Choice Award at the 1996 MTV Music Video Awards. The song was voted number 5 on the Australian annual music poll Triple J Hottest 100 in 1996.

== Charts ==
=== Weekly charts ===
Chart (1995–1996)	Peak Position
Australia (ARIA)	5
Canada Top Singles (RPM)	38
Canada Rock/Alternative (RPM)	3
European Alternative Rock (Music & Media)	18
Iceland (Íslenski Listinn Topp 40)	21
Netherlands (Single Top 100)	41
Netherlands (Dutch Top 40 Tipparade)	17
New Zealand (Recorded Music NZ)	31
Quebec Airplay (ADISQ)	2
US Billboard Hot 100	28
US Alternative Airplay (Billboard)	1
US Mainstream Rock Airplay (Billboard)	4
US Pop Airplay (Billboard)	28
US Cash Box Top 100	20

=== Year-end charts ===
Chart (1996)	Position
Australia (ARIA)	56
US Hot 100 Singles Airplay (Billboard)	59
US Mainstream Rock Tracks (Billboard)	15
US Modern Rock Tracks (Billboard)	16

== Certifications ==
Region	Certification	Certified units/sales
Australia (ARIA)	Gold	35,000^{^}
New Zealand (RMNZ)	2× Platinum	60,000^{‡}
^{^} Shipments figures based on certification alone.^{‡} Sales+streaming figures based on certification alone.

== Live version ==
"Glycerine" (live)

Single by Bush featuring Gwen Stefani
- Released: 13 December 2012
- Recorded: 8 December 2012
- Venue: Gibson Amphitheatre (Los Angeles, CA)
- Genre: Post-grunge
- Length: 4:38
- Label: Zuma Rock
- Songwriter: Gavin Rossdale

Bush singles chronology
"Baby Come Home" (2012)	"Glycerine" (live) (2012)	"The Only Way Out" (2014)

Gwen Stefani singles chronology
"Early Winter" (2008)	"Glycerine" (live) (2012)	"Baby Don't Lie" (2014)

Audio video
- "Glycerine" (live) on YouTube

Bush performed a new version of "Glycerine" at KROQ Almost Acoustic Christmas on 8 December 2012, which featured a surprise appearance from American singer and songwriter, and Gavin Rossdale's then-wife Gwen Stefani. The single was never released on an album, as both Stefani and Bush were not working on any new material.

"Glycerine" live single sales and broadcast chart positions
Chart (2013)	Peak position
US Alternative Digital Singles (Billboard)	16
US Hot Rock & Alternative Songs (Billboard)	38
US Rock Digital Songs (Billboard)	22
