= Lists of number-one singles (Austria) =

The listing of number-one hits in Austria taken from the Ö3 Austria Top 40 listing per year can be found as follows:

== Number-one singles ==
- List of number-one hits of 1989 (Austria)
- List of number-one hits of 1990 (Austria)
- List of number-one hits of 1991 (Austria)
- List of number-one hits of 1992 (Austria)
- List of number-one hits of 1993 (Austria)
- List of number-one hits of 1994 (Austria)
- List of number-one hits of 1995 (Austria)
- List of number-one hits of 1996 (Austria)
- List of number-one hits of 1997 (Austria)
- List of number-one hits of 1998 (Austria)
- List of number-one hits of 1999 (Austria)
- List of number-one hits of 2000 (Austria)
- List of number-one hits of 2001 (Austria)
- List of number-one hits of 2002 (Austria)
- List of number-one hits of 2003 (Austria)
- List of number-one hits of 2004 (Austria)
- List of number-one hits of 2005 (Austria)
- List of number-one hits of 2006 (Austria)
- List of number-one hits of 2007 (Austria)

== Number-one singles and albums ==
- List of number-one hits of 2008 (Austria)
- List of number-one hits of 2009 (Austria)
- List of number-one hits of 2010 (Austria)
- List of number-one hits of 2011 (Austria)
- List of number-one hits of 2012 (Austria)
- List of number-one hits of 2013 (Austria)
- List of number-one hits of 2014 (Austria)
- List of number-one hits of 2015 (Austria)
- List of number-one hits of 2016 (Austria)
- List of number-one hits of 2017 (Austria)
- List of number-one hits of 2018 (Austria)
- List of number-one hits of 2019 (Austria)
- List of number-one hits of 2020 (Austria)
- List of number-one hits of 2021 (Austria)
- List of number-one hits of 2022 (Austria)
- List of number-one hits of 2023 (Austria)
- List of number-one hits of 2024 (Austria)
- List of number-one hits of 2025 (Austria)
- List of number-one hits of 2026 (Austria)
