= The Scrap Iron Rhythm Revue =

Compilation album by Stavely Makepeace
- Released: 24 May 2004
- Recorded: 1969–1984
- Studios: Rob Woodward's house, Coventry
- Genres: Avant-pop; lo-fi
- Length: 65:31
- Label: RPM Records
- Producer: Stavely Makepeace

Stavely Makepeace chronology
The Scrap Iron Rhythm Revue (2004)	The Singles (2017)

The Scrap Iron Rhythm Revue is a compilation album and the first album overall by English avant-pop band Stavely Makepeace, released in May 2004 by reissue label RPM Records. Compiled by journalist Bob Stanley, it contains a string of singles recorded between 1969 and 1984 that the band recorded in their home studio and released on various record labels. The band, primarily consisting of Rob Woodward and Nigel Fletcher, were influenced by Joe Meek, and started the band in order to explore experimental and disparate ideas within pop music, describing their musical style as the "scrap iron sound" in reference to their incorporation of unusual instruments. Their singles were commercially unsuccessful, though the band would find major success with "Mouldy Old Dough" (1972) under the extended line-up of Lieutenant Pigeon.

Though Lieutenant Pigeon were subject to a "best of" compilation in 2001, The Scrap Iron Rhythm Revue marked the first time that Stavely Makepeace released a compilation of their material, following the appearance of their 1972 single "Slippery Rock '70s" on the compilation Velvet Tinmine (2003), which compiled obscure glam rock singles. The Scrap Iron Rhythm Revue received critical acclaim, with praise given to the idiosyncratic songs and production. The producers of Hot Fuzz used "Slippery Rock '70s" in the film after hearing it on the compilation, somewhat rising the band's profile.

== Background and release ==
=== Band career ===
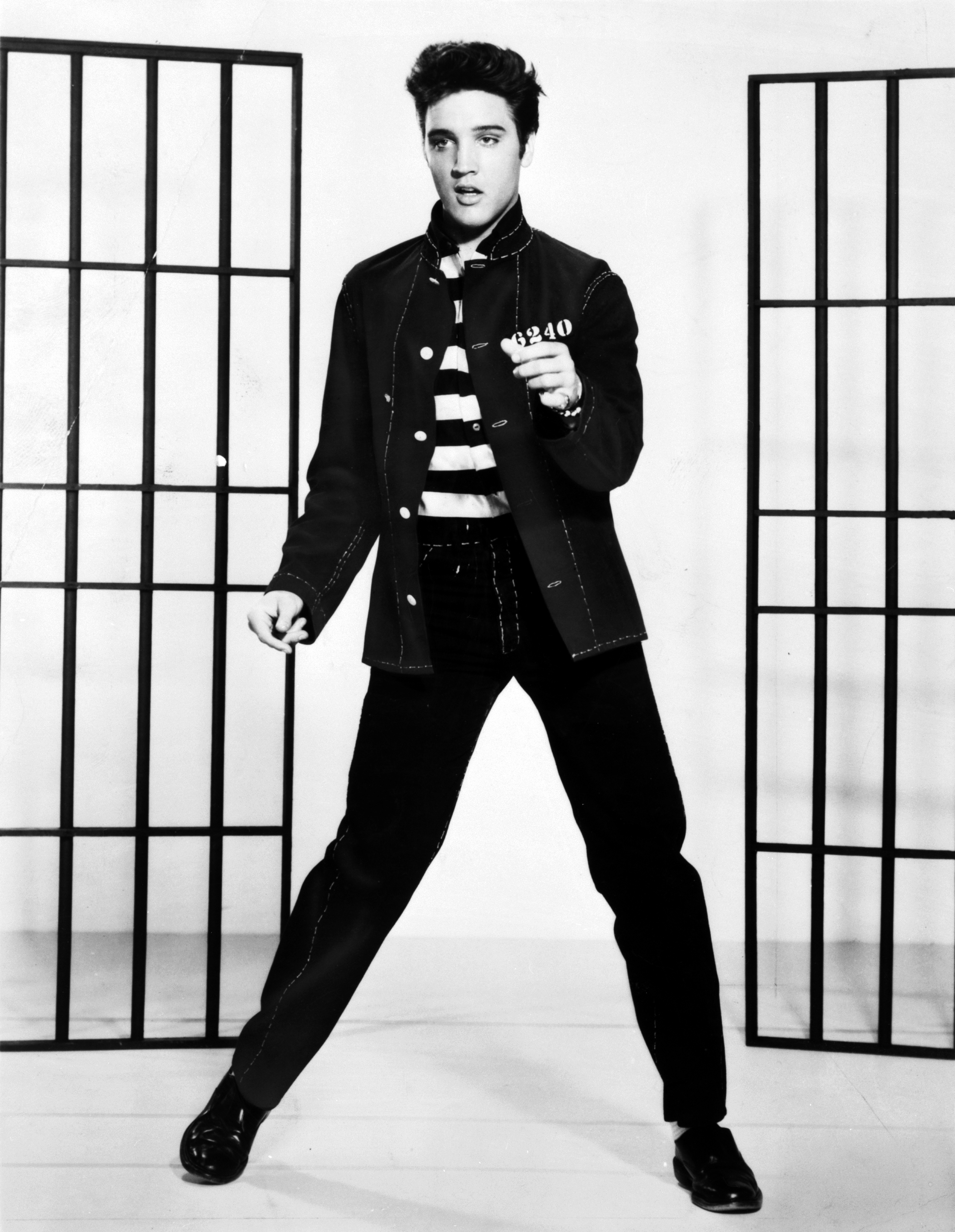
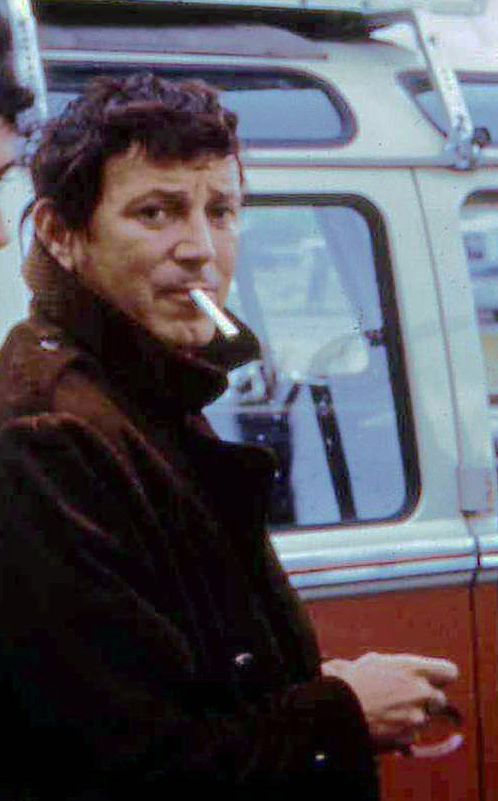
Elvis Presley and Gene Vincent, both influences on Stavely Makepeace.

Rob Woodward (born in Coventry in 1945) became a professional musician in 1963 and released two unsuccessful singles under the name Shel Naylor on Decca Records between 1963 and 1964 before the label dropped him, which resulted in him returning to performing on the nightclub circuit. It was at this stage that he began collaboration with Nigel Fletcher. The music that the pair made together was eccentric pop, reflecting their obsession with producer Joe Meek. The pair were separated while Fletcher served in the British Merchant Navy, but their creative partnership was resumed in late 1968 after Fletcher was discharged. They moved into the Coventry home of Woodward's mother Hilda, and set up their own makeshift recording studio in her living room. They dubbed their project Stavely Makepeace and added Pete Fisher on bass and Don Ker on drums to flesh out their initial sessions.

The duo experimented with disparate musical ideas in the studio, allegedly taking influence from Elvis Presley and Gene Vincent, despite Stavely Makepeace's music bearing little to no resemblance to either performer. Stavely Makepeace referred to the style of music they created as the "scrap iron sound," the name referring to how they relied on experimentation as much as they did musicianship. This followed Joe Meek's ideas of sound creation in that, for as long as a sound is considered great, it does not matter how it is produced. The duo became confident enough to record a number of songs to take to different record labels. Pyramid Records took interest in the band and released their debut single, "(I Want to Love You Like a) Mad Dog", in mid-1969. Before Pyramid could release the band's projected second single, "Reggae Denny", the label went bankrupt. They added guitarist Steve Tayton on guitar and woodwinds in early 1970 and, following the departure of Fisher, Steve Johnson joined the band as the replacement bassist. The band signed to Concord Records and scored a minor hit with "Edna," which was performed by the band on Top of the Pops. It was first released by Concorde in the UK in 1970 and was then released by EMI in France on 14 August and by Deutsche Grammophon in Germany two weeks later, an example of Concorde's continental distribution deal with the two latter labels.

The single was followed by 1971's "Smokey Mountain Rhythm Revue", whose tongue-in-cheek instrumental B-side, "Rampant on the Rage," inspired the creation of a side-project band named Lieutenant Pigeon, who had the same line-up as Stavely Makepeace but with the addition of Woodward's mother Hilda on piano. This single was in turn followed by "Give Me That Pistol" later on in 1971. Despite Woodward and Fletcher being so productive in the early 1970s that they would write at least a song a week for the Stavely Makepeace project, none of Stavely Makepeace's singles had been successful so far, and this pattern continued when they left Concorde and released a trio of singles on Spark Records. Their first single for Spark, "Slippery Rock '70s" (1972), nonetheless received airplay on BBC Radio 1 by Dave Lee Travis. Meanwhile, as Lieutenant Pigeon, the members had found success when "Mouldy Old Dough", a novelty instrumental that unfaithfully replicated vintage pub music in an "odd and off" fashion with growled vocals, reached number 1 on the UK Singles Chart, becoming one of the best-selling singles of 1972 and also allowing its 1973 follow-up "Desperate Dan" to reach number 17.

After the release of Stavely Makepeace' final Spark singles "Walking Through the Blue Glass" (1972) and "Prima Donna" (1973), the band released "Cajun Band" on Deram Records to further public indifference. When 1974's "Runaround Sue" also flopped, the band focused their attention on Lieutenant Pigeon. The Stavely Makepeace outtakes "Baby Blue Eyes" and "No Regrets" were released to no success by Unigram Records in 1977 and Barn Records in 1978 respectively, but convinced the band to reunite. Nonetheless, when the 1980 Hammer Records single "Songs of Yesterday" and 1983's self-released "Just Tell Her Fred Said Goodbye" both flopped, the pair permanently discontinued Stavely Makepeace and once again focused on the long-lived Lieutenant Pigeon. Woodward and Fletcher also continued their partnership in other ventures, including voice-overs and radio jingles and the 2001 joint autobiography When Show Business Is No Business.

=== Compilation ===
For a lengthy period of time, Stavely Makepeace's material was left uncompiled. This was in contrast to Lieutenant Pigeon, who were subject to the Cherry Red Records compilation The Best of Lieutenant Pigeon (2001), which combined the band's 1970s singles alongside album tracks and unreleased songs. In February 2003, Stavely Makepeace's 1972 single "Slippery Rock '70s" appeared on the various artists compilation Velvet Tinmine, which compiled 20 obscure glam rock singles from the 1970s. Interest in the group had picked up, which allowed the band to release a compilation of their material. Named The Scrap Iron Rhythm Revue after the band's description of their musical style, the album compiles most of the band's singles, recorded between 1969 and 1984, and is their first overall album. The BBC noted that, with the compilation, "it took thirty-six years for Stavely Makepeace to release their first album." It features 22 tracks and was compiled by journalist and musician Bob Stanley with help from Mark Stratford, whose reissue label, RPM Records, released the compilation on 24 May 2004. The album's lengthy liner notes are written by the band themselves. Lora Findlay designed the album artwork.

== Musical style ==
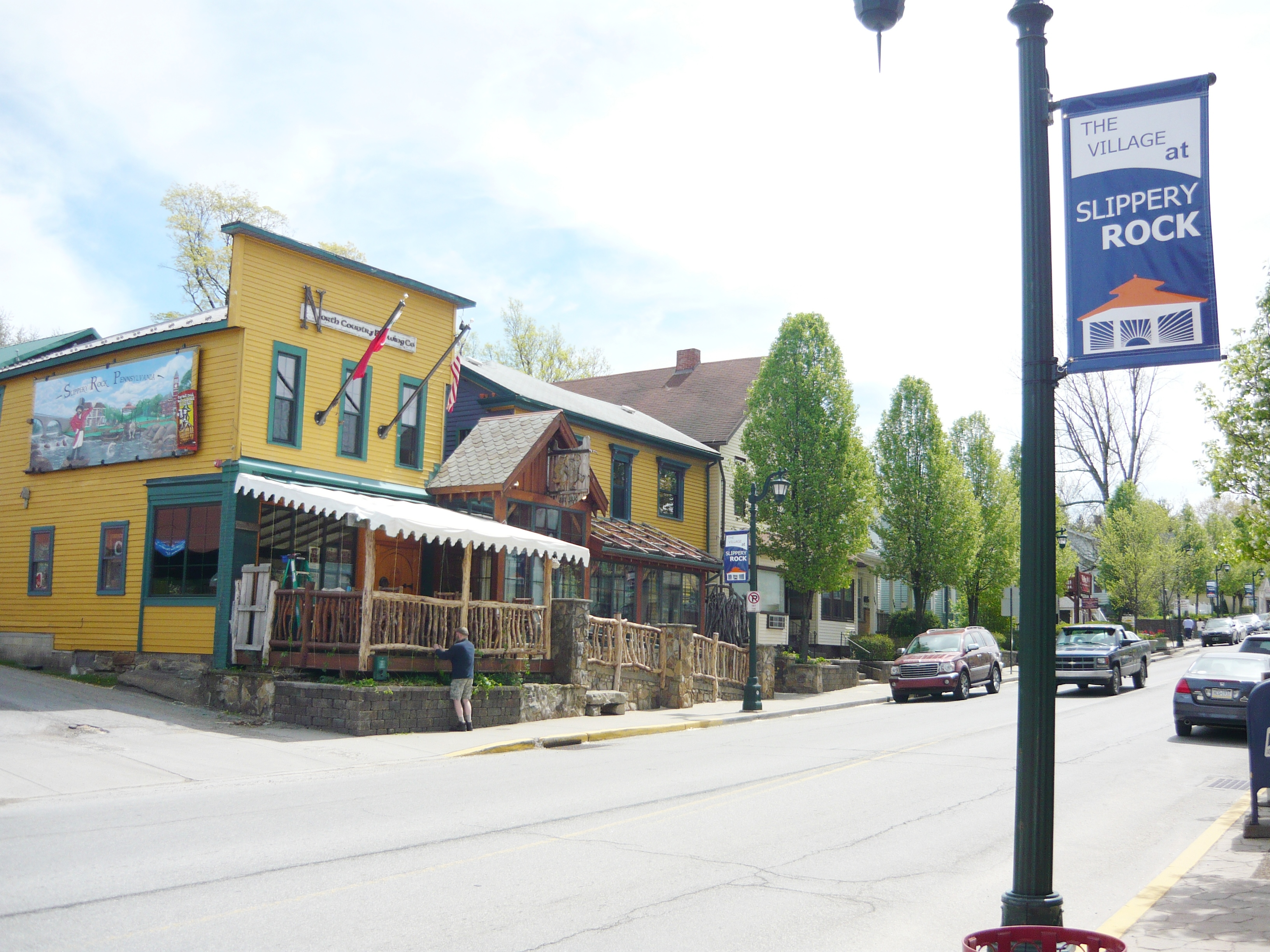
"Slippery Rock '70s" is named after the borough in Pennsylvania.

In their reviews of The Scrap Iron Rhythm Revue, critics highlighted the unusual, disparate sound to the songs. Uncut felt that the band fused 1970s MOR music with DIY avant-garde, and wrote: "Speeding up and multi-tracking home recordings in their mum's front room, they concocted phased, clunking West Midlands exotica and spliced whole new genres: radiophonic cajun reggae, yodelling steam-punk, Joe Meek boogie." AllMusic made note that, as was the case with Lieutenant Pigeon's output, Stavely Makepeace's home productions focused on applying quirky, moderately lo-fi production to simplistic pop songs with strong echoes of both British novelty music and 1950s rock and roll, with songs boasting fiddle lines, horns, old-fashioned piano and "anachronistic" use of echo. Unlike the largely instrumental Lieutenant Pigeon, the music on The Scrap Iron Rhythm Revue is generally more focused on songs with vocals. Bob Stanley made note of the band's "Dada" sound.

Their 1969 debut single "(I Wanna Love You Like a) Mad Dog" opens the compilation. According to Stanley, the song "sounds like a one-man oompah band" that has been phased to "simulate a psychedelic experience." It features tongue-in-cheek sexual lyrics that Stanley compared to the controversial lyrics of Marie Lloyd. "Edna" is a pop song with the high pitched refrain – sung by either Woodward or Fletcher – of "Ed-ed, Ed-ed, Ed-ed-ed-ed-Edna, let me sing my beautiful song." The BBC described the song's vocals as "quirky" yodelling. In comparing the band's eclectic array of styles, they also felt it contrasted with the rock and roll-styled "Runaround Sue".

Their 1972 single "Slippery Rock '70s" was recorded as the "slightly rocky" backing to a track named "Fan It". When Woodward and Fletcher attempted to add vocals to the track, they agreed it would sound better without singing, thus erased the vocals and shelved the remaining track. A chance meeting with Spark Records' Bob Kingston, who heard the backing track by accident when listening to a tape of the band's material, believed it to be a completed instrumental and told the band it was impressive enough to release as a single, although a name was needed. Fletcher named it "Slippery Rock" after the borough in Pennsylvania where he had recently stayed. The "70s" suffix was added by Spark. Uncut felt the song "glimmered with authentic strangeness."

== Reception and legacy ==
Professional ratings
Review scores
Source	Rating
AllMusic	4.5/5 stars
Uncut	3/5 stars

The Scrap Iron Rhythm Revue received positive reviews from critics. As was the case with The Best of Lieutenant Pigeon, The Scrap Iron Rhythm Revue received four and a half stars out of five from AllMusic and was named an "Album Pick". Writing for the website, Richie Unterberger felt that even though the singles compiled on the album "aimed for the pop charts," they had been unsuccessful because Woodward and Nigel were "just a little too strange for their own good." He felt the "idiosyncratic production" was more interesting than the songs, but felt that the compilation does "justice" to the band's legacy. Uncut felt that the compilation proved that the band consistently created genuinely unusual songs, and wrote that: "Their destiny was as a novelty footnote, but this exemplary reissue excavates a weirdly potent homebrew 10cc."

The producers of the 2007 comedy film Hot Fuzz decided to use "Slippery Rock 70s" in the film's soundtrack after hearing it on the compilation. Fletcher paid to see the film to see if the instrumental was used and was pleased to hear it used in its entirety. It was the first time that Fletcher had been enquired by others to use a Stavely Makepeace track in a project, and helped rise the band's profile, with the Coventry Telegraph calling it the band's "big break." Jamie Hewlett of Gorillaz became a fan of the band. "(I Wanna Love You Like a) Mad Dog" features on the protopunk compilation Punk 45: Sick On You! One Way Spit! After The Love & Before The Revolution - Proto-Punk 1970-77 Vol. 3, released in 2014 by Soul Jazz Records. In 2015, Stavely Makepeace reunited to release the one-off comeback single "Time Marches On," a song which was described by the Coventry Telegraph as "as quirky" as the band's other material and as tracking the advent of pop music since the 1950s.

== Track listing ==
1. "(I Wanna Love You Like a) Mad Dog" – 3:45
2. "Edna" – 2:22
3. "Smokey Mountain Rhythm Revue" – 2:53
4. "Walking Through the Blue Grass" – 2:46
5. "The Sundance" – 2:51
6. "Give Me That Pistol" – 2:15
7. "Slippery Rock ’70s" – 2:51
8. "Cajun Band" – 2:51
9. "Memories of Your Love" – 2:43
10. "Prima Donna" – 2:43
11. "Swings and Roundabouts" – 2:14
12. "There's a Wall Between Us" – 4:20
13. "Summer Weekends" – 3:11
14. "Baby Blue Eyes" – 3:26
15. "Big Bad Baby Blondie" – 2:03
16. "No Regrets" – 3:39
17. "Cradle of Love" – 3:04
18. "Hell Bent on Rock'n'Roll" – 3:16
19. "Songs of Yesterday" – 2:55
20. "Gillie's Bar Is Empty" – 2:44
21. "Mr Pleasant" – 2:52
22. "Just Tell Her Fred Said Goodbye" – 3:49

== Personnel ==
=== Stavely Makepeace ===
- Rob Woodward
- Nigel Fletcher

=== Production ===
- Bob Stanley – compiling, producing
- Lora Findlay – design, artwork
- Nigel Fletcher – production
- Rob Woodward – production
- Mark Stratford – production
