= Pierre Cosso =

French actor

Pierre Cosso, born Pierre-Alexandre Cosso (24 September 1961 in Algiers), is a French actor and singer-songwriter.

== Career ==
Cosso's first film was the popular teen comedy-drama La Boum 2 (1982), in which he played Sophie Marceau's boyfriend. In the following years, he worked as an actor in film productions in France, Italy and the United States. During that time in the 1980s, he achieved a considerable status as a teen idol in many parts of Europe. Among his most successful roles was the part of Mizio in the romantic comedy Cinderella '80 (1984).

Cosso continued his acting career after the 1980s. In the American film An American Werewolf in Paris (1997) he had a supporting role as the werewolf Claude. He also appeared in leading roles in television productions including Les Cœurs brûlés (1992) and Les Yeux d'Hélène (1994). Between 2000 and 2002, Pierre Cosso played in the theatre production Ladies Night at the Théâtre Rive Gauche in Paris, then on tour. His last acting credit in front of a camera (until at least 2020) was for the Italian television series Anna e i cinque (2008-2011), in which he and Sabrina Ferilli played the leading roles. In August 2019, the actor returned to the stage with the play Nuit d'ivresse, a cult play from the 1980s written by Josiane Balasko. The play he directed sold out at the theater of the Maison de la Culture in Papeete.

Pierre Cosso also recorded several 45s as a singer in the 1980s. The song "Stay", which he sang together with his Cinderella '80-co-star Bonnie Bianco, was successful: When the film was first shown in Germany in 1987, the single reached the No. 1 in the German Singles Charts. He continued his music career in the 2000s by making a radical turn through the "ethnic electro-acoustic" style. In November 2019, the actor returned to music with Le Gang des rêve, a title from the future album signed by the Cosso Gang, a musical group with a pop-rock tendency of which he is the frontman.

== Personal life ==
The family father Cosso has semi-retired from acting and lives today in his adopted home French Polynesia, where he works as a skipper. He also has an internet blog in which he writes about his life in Polynesia.

Various TV magazines have devoted documentaries to him. In February 2016, he took part in the 11th edition of the Italian version of Dancing with the Stars called Ballando con le stelle.

He also had love affairs with actress Sophie Marceau, the model Nathalie Marquay and the singer Zazie.

== Filmography ==
=== Film ===
- 1981 Beau Pere de Bertrand Blier as Apparition
- 1982 La Boum 2 de Claude Pinoteau as Philippe Berthier
- 1984 Cinderella '80 as Mizio
- 1984 Windsurf - Il vento nelle mani as Pierre
- 1986 Rosa la rose, fille publique as Julien
- 1987 Mes quarante premières années (I miei primi 40 anni) de Carlo Vanzina as Massimiliano
- 1992 À la vitesse d'un cheval au galop de Fabien Onteniente as Le Handicapé
- 1997 An American Werewolf in Paris de Anthony Waller as Claude
- 2000 La Candide Madame Duff de Jean-Pierre Mocky as Nolan
- 2003 Instructing the Heart de Giovanni Morricone as Giulio Fontana
- 2004 Sin's Kitchen de Fabien Pruvot as Reece

=== Television ===
==== Television films ====
- 1994 Flics de choc: le dernier baroud de Henri Helman as Beauclair
- 1994 Michele alla guerra de Franco Rossi as Bleriot
- 1996 Flics de choc : Une femme traquée de Michaëla Watteaux as Beauclair
- 1996 Flics de choc: La dernière vague de Arnaud Sélignac as Beauclair
- 1998 Le Cœur et l'Épée (Il cuore e la spada) de Fabrizio Costa as Kurvenal
- 1999 Mai con i quadri de Mario Caiano

==== Television series ====
- 1986 Mino as Rico
- 1987 Nul ne revient sur ses pas (Nessuno torna indietro) as Maurice
- 1988 Très belle et trop naïve (La romana) as Giacomo
- 1989 Quattro piccole donne
- 1991 The Adventures of the Black Stallion as Julien
- 1992 Les cœurs brûlés as Christian
- 1993 Une année en Provence (A Year in Provence) as Abbé Pain
- 1993 Charlemagne, le prince à cheval as Olivier
- 1994 Les Yeux d'Hélène as Christian
- 1994 Extrême Limite as Jean-Paul Mavic
- 1995 Les Cordier, juge et flic as Claude (saison 2, épisode 4 Un si joli témoin)
- 1996 Troubles (Strangers) as Mia
- 1996 Senza cuore
- 1998 Van Loc : un grand flic de Marseille as Pierre Renoir
- 2001 72 heures
- 2006 Léa Parker En immersion)
- 2008 Anna e i cinque as Ferdinando Ferrari
