= List of number-one singles in 1973 (New Zealand) =

This is a list of number-one hit singles in 1973 in New Zealand, starting with the first chart dated, 2 February 1973.

== Chart ==
Week	Artist	Title
5 January 1973	Summer break - no chart	Summer break - no chart
12 January 1973	Lieutenant Pigeon	"Mouldy Old Dough"
19 January 1973	Lieutenant Pigeon	"Mouldy Old Dough"
26 January 1973	Lieutenant Pigeon	"Mouldy Old Dough"
2 February 1973	Lobo	"I'd Love You to Want Me"
9 February 1973	Lobo	"I'd Love You to Want Me"
16 February 1973	Lobo	"I'd Love You to Want Me"
23 February 1973	Carly Simon	"You're So Vain"
2 March 1973	Carly Simon	"You're So Vain"
9 March 1973	Carly Simon	"You're So Vain"
15 March 1973	Carly Simon	"You're So Vain"
23 March 1973	Sweet	"Block Buster!"
30 March 1973	Sweet	"Block Buster!"
6 April 1973	Sweet	"Block Buster!"
13 April 1973	Elton John	"Crocodile Rock"
20 April 1973	Elton John	"Crocodile Rock"
27 April 1973	Roberta Flack	"Killing Me Softly with His Song"
4 May 1973	Roberta Flack	"Killing Me Softly with His Song"
11 May 1973	The Carpenters / Steve Allen	"Top of the World"
18 May 1973	Roberta Flack	"Killing Me Softly with His Song"
25 May 1973	Roberta Flack	"Killing Me Softly with His Song"
1 June 1973	Tony Orlando & Dawn	"Tie a Yellow Ribbon Round the Ole Oak Tree"
8 June 1973	Tony Orlando & Dawn	"Tie a Yellow Ribbon Round the Ole Oak Tree"
16 June 1973	Tony Orlando & Dawn	"Tie a Yellow Ribbon Round the Ole Oak Tree"
22 June 1973	Tony Orlando & Dawn	"Tie a Yellow Ribbon Round the Ole Oak Tree"
1 July 1973	Tony Orlando & Dawn	"Tie a Yellow Ribbon Round the Ole Oak Tree"
6 July 1973	Tony Orlando & Dawn	"Tie a Yellow Ribbon Round the Ole Oak Tree"
13 July 1973	Tony Orlando & Dawn	"Tie a Yellow Ribbon Round the Ole Oak Tree"
20 July 1973	Tony Orlando & Dawn	"Tie a Yellow Ribbon Round the Ole Oak Tree"
27 July 1973	Tony Orlando & Dawn	"Tie a Yellow Ribbon Round the Ole Oak Tree"
3 August 1973	Tony Orlando & Dawn	"Tie a Yellow Ribbon Round the Ole Oak Tree"
10 August 1973	Three Dog Night	"Shambala"
17 August 1973	Three Dog Night	"Shambala"
24 August 1973	Clint Holmes	"Playground In My Mind"
31 August 1973	Clint Holmes	"Playground In My Mind"
7 September 1973	Helen Reddy	"Delta Dawn"
14 September 1973	Helen Reddy	"Delta Dawn"
21 September 1973	Helen Reddy	"Delta Dawn"
28 September 1973	Helen Reddy	"Delta Dawn"
5 October 1973	Helen Reddy	"Delta Dawn"
12 October 1973	Helen Reddy	"Delta Dawn"
19 October 1973	Paul Simon	"Take Me To The Mardi Gras"
26 October 1973	Paul Simon	"Take Me To The Mardi Gras"
2 November 1973	Paul Simon	"Take Me To The Mardi Gras"
9 November 1973	Cher	"Half-Breed"
16 November 1973	Les Humphries Singers	"Mexico"
23 November 1973	Sweet	"The Ballroom Blitz"
30 November 1973	Sweet	"The Ballroom Blitz"
7 December 1973	Sweet	"The Ballroom Blitz"
14 December 1973	Ringo Starr	"Photograph"
22 December 1973	Ringo Starr	"Photograph"
29 December 1973	Summer break - no chart	Summer break - no chart
