= List of number-one hits of 1989 (Austria) =

This is a list of the Austrian Singles Chart number-one hits of 1989.

Issue date	Song	Artist
1 January	"Bring Me Edelweiss"	Edelweiss
8 January	"Bring Me Edelweiss"	Edelweiss
15 January	"Don't Worry, Be Happy"	Bobby McFerrin
22 January	"Don't Worry, Be Happy"	Bobby McFerrin
1 February	"The First Time"	Robin Beck
8 February	"The First Time"	Robin Beck
15 February	"The First Time"	Robin Beck
22 February	"The First Time"	Robin Beck
1 March	"The First Time"	Robin Beck
8 March	"The First Time"	Robin Beck
15 March	"She Drives Me Crazy"	Fine Young Cannibals
22 March	"She Drives Me Crazy"	Fine Young Cannibals
29 March	"She Drives Me Crazy"	Fine Young Cannibals
6 April	"She Drives Me Crazy"	Fine Young Cannibals
13 April	"She Drives Me Crazy"	Fine Young Cannibals
20 April	"She Drives Me Crazy"	Fine Young Cannibals
27 April	"She Drives Me Crazy"	Fine Young Cannibals
1 May	"She Drives Me Crazy"	Fine Young Cannibals
15 May	"Looking for Freedom"	David Hasselhoff
22 May	"Looking for Freedom"	David Hasselhoff
1 June	"Nur ein Lied"	Thomas Forstner
8 June	"Nur ein Lied"	Thomas Forstner
15 June	"Nur ein Lied"	Thomas Forstner
22 June	"Nur ein Lied"	Thomas Forstner
29 June	"Nur ein Lied"	Thomas Forstner
6 July	"Nur ein Lied"	Thomas Forstner
13 July	"Nur ein Lied"	Thomas Forstner
20 July	"Nur ein Lied"	Thomas Forstner
1 August	"Americanos"	Holly Johnson
8 August	"Americanos"	Holly Johnson
15 August	"A Cry in the Night"	Lory "Bonnie" Bianco
22 August	"A Cry in the Night"	Lory "Bonnie" Bianco
29 August	"A Cry in the Night"	Lory "Bonnie" Bianco
6 September	"A Cry in the Night"	Lory "Bonnie" Bianco
15 September	"Swing the Mood"	Jive Bunny and the Mastermixers
22 September	"Swing the Mood"	Jive Bunny and the Mastermixers
29 September	"Swing the Mood"	Jive Bunny and the Mastermixers
6 October	"Swing the Mood"	Jive Bunny and the Mastermixers
15 October	"Lambada"	Kaoma
22 October	"Lambada"	Kaoma
29 October	"Lambada"	Kaoma
5 November	"Lambada"	Kaoma
12 November	"Lambada"	Kaoma
19 November	"Lambada"	Kaoma
1 December	"Girl I'm Gonna Miss You"	Milli Vanilli
8 December	"Girl I'm Gonna Miss You"	Milli Vanilli
15 December	"Girl I'm Gonna Miss You"	Milli Vanilli
22 December	"Girl I'm Gonna Miss You"	Milli Vanilli

== See also ==
- 1989 in music
