= An American Werewolf in Paris =

1997 film

- Theatrical release poster
- Directed by: Anthony Waller
- Written by: Tim Burns; Tom Stern; Anthony Waller
- Based on: Characters by John Landis
- Produced by: Richard Claus
- Starring: Tom Everett Scott; Julie Delpy; Vince Vieluf; Phil Buckman; Julie Bowen; Pierre Cosso; Tom Novembre; Thierry Lhermitte
- Cinematography: Egon Werdin
- Edited by: Peter R. Adam
- Music by: Wilbert Hirsch
- Production companies: Hollywood Pictures; J&M Entertainment; Stonewood Productions; Propaganda Films; Cometstone Pictures
- Distributed by: Buena Vista Pictures Distribution (United States and Canada); Metropolitan Filmexport (France); Columbia TriStar Film Distributors International (Benelux); J&M Entertainment (International)
- Release dates: October 31, 1997 (United Kingdom); December 25, 1997 (United States); March 6, 1998 (France)
- Running time: 102 minutes
- Countries: United States; France; Netherlands; Luxembourg
- Languages: English; French
- Budget: $25 million
- Box office: $26.6 million

An American Werewolf in Paris (titled onscreen as American Werewolf in Paris) is a 1997 comedy horror film directed by Anthony Waller, screenplay by Tim Burns, Tom Stern, and Waller, and starring Tom Everett Scott and Julie Delpy. It was conceived as a sequel to John Landis's 1981 film An American Werewolf in London, which was distributed by Universal Pictures. As of production, all narrative references to the first film had been removed. The film is an international co-production between companies from the United States, France, the Netherlands, and Luxembourg, and it was distributed by Buena Vista Pictures under its Hollywood Pictures label.

The film was met with negative reviews from critics and grossed over $26 million against a $25 million budget at the box office.

== Plot ==
Andy McDermott is a tourist seeing the sights of Paris with his friends Brad and Chris. When Serafine Pigot leaps off the Eiffel Tower just before Andy is about to bungee jump, he executes a mid-air rescue. She vanishes into the night, leaving Andy intrigued. After soon tracking her down and meeting her, Andy talks Serafine into going on a date with him. Andy and his friends also meet Serafine's friend Claude, who invites them to his underground nightclub, Club de la Lune. That night at the club, Serafine isn't there, so Chris volunteers to go back to her house. He frees her from a cell in the basement and is locked in it. He escapes after finding a legless werewolf confined to a bed. The club's owner, Claude, is actually the leader of a werewolf society that uses the club as a way to lure in people to be killed. Serafine arrives, tells Andy to run away, and transforms into a werewolf. The club owners also transform into werewolves and butcher all the guests, including Brad.

The next day, Andy wakes up at Serafine's house. She tells him he is transforming into a werewolf. This revelation is interrupted by the ghost of Serafine's mother, Alex Price. Andy jumps out the window in panic and runs away. Chris tries to get his attention, but Claude kidnaps him. Brad's ghost appears to Andy and explains his werewolf condition. For Andy to become normal again, he must eat the heart of the werewolf that bit him, and for Brad's ghost to be at rest, the werewolf that killed him must be killed. After developing an appetite for raw meat, Andy hooks up with American tourist Amy Finch at a cemetery. He transforms and kills her and a cop who tailed him, suspecting Andy was involved in the Club de la Lune massacre. Andy is arrested but escapes. He begins to see Amy's ghost, who tries to find ways to get him killed.

Claude and his henchmen capture Andy and pressure him to join their society, but Andy must kill Chris to prove his loyalty. Serafine again saves him, and they return to her home to find her basement ransacked and her stepfather Thierry Pigot, the confined werewolf, dead. Serafine explains Thierry prepared a drug to control werewolf transformations, but it had the opposite effect: forced transformation. As a result of testing on Serafine, she killed Alex and savaged Thierry. Claude stole the drugs during the ransacking. Serafine also mentions that Claude previously stole her blood in order to become a werewolf in the first place.

Andy and Serafine learn of a Fourth of July party Claude has planned and infiltrate it. They try to help the people escape but flee after seeing that police have entered. Claude and his men inject themselves with the drug and slaughter almost all the guests. Andy and Serafine flee after killing a werewolf and setting Brad's spirit free. Serafine takes the drug to fight another werewolf when they become separated. Andy encounters them and, not knowing who is who, accidentally shoots her, leaving her to be found by the police. A werewolf then attacks him, chasing him down to an underground train track. The train stops after hitting the werewolf. It gets on the train, where it attacks the driver and several passengers. The drug wears off, revealing Claude as the werewolf. Claude tries to inject himself with the last vial, but Andy interrupts him. In the ensuing fight, Andy discovers that Claude is responsible for his infection. The two struggle to obtain the last vial of the drug, and Andy is accidentally injected. After transforming, Andy kills Claude and eats his heart, thus ending his own curse and reviving Serafine. An ambulance transports her to the hospital.

Serafine and Andy celebrate their wedding atop the Statue of Liberty with Andy's pal Chris, who survived. They bungee jump off the statue when Chris accidentally drops the wedding ring.

== Cast ==
- Tom Everett Scott as Andy McDermott
- Julie Delpy as Sérafine Pigot
- Vince Vieluf as Brad
- Phil Buckman as Chris
- Julie Bowen as Amy Finch
- Pierre Cosso as Claude
- Tom Novembre as Inspector LeDuc
- Thierry Lhermitte as Thierry Pigot
- Anthony Waller as Metro Driver
- Isabelle Constantini as Alex Price (credited as "Serafine's Mother")

== Production ==
=== Development ===
When production of An American Werewolf in London ran into trouble with British Equity, director John Landis, having scouted locations in Paris, considered moving the production to France and changing its title to An American Werewolf in Paris.

Landis was approached by PolyGram Pictures to develop a sequel to the first movie, as Landis explained in the book Beware the Moon: The Story of An American Werewolf in London:

I was asked to do a sequel by PolyGram in 1991. The company, under Jon Peters and Peter Guber, made something like 10 or 12 movies, and the only one that made money was American Werewolf. They then left the company and were replaced by a guy called Michael Kuhn. He called me and said that they were interested in making a sequel. I entertained the idea for a little bit and then came up with something that I liked and wrote a first draft of the script.

Landis's draft focused on Debbie Klein (a character only mentioned in the original film) getting a job in London, and her subsequent investigation into the deaths of David Kessler (David Naughton) and Jack Goodman (Griffin Dunne). Several roles were reprised from the original film, including Alex Price (Jenny Agutter), Dr. J. S. Hirsch (John Woodvine), and Sgt. McManus (Paul Kember), but the studio declined the script. Polygram Pictures still wanted to do a sequel, but Landis, unwilling to write a second treatment, told them to just make the sequel without him.

Around the same time, writer/director John Lafia had written and submitted his own draft to the studio. The storyline for Lafia's draft focused on a schoolteacher in Paris who holds forth on good and evil in a class he teaches. The teacher is bitten by a lycanthrope and goes through the expected changes, while on his trail is Dr. Hirsch from the first film, who has been working on a werewolf serum. In a December 1990 interview in Fangoria #99, Lafia had stated that the studio was not interested in his script: "As it stands now it will most likely never be made, which is too bad. Maybe I'll retitle it and call it The Howling VII: The Intelligent Version".

After Lafia left the project, Tom Stern and Tim Burns, who had previously worked on the short-lived MTV series The Idiot Box and the 1993 comedy film Freaked, were hired to write a new script, with Stern set as director. Stern and Burns's script followed a young American named Andy McDermott (Tom Everett Scott), who is vacationing in Spain when he is called to Paris after hearing that his uncle was savaged by a mysterious beast there. In keeping with the tradition of An American Werewolf in London, Stern and Burns loaded the script with as many songs referring to the moon as they could find. As part of the preproduction process, Stern had makeup effects (FX) artists Steve Johnson and Tony Gardner work on preliminary designs for the monster, and Phil Tippett, who had worked on Jurassic Park, was going to use computer graphics to bring the beast to life for full-body shots, while the closeups would be handled by the makeup FX crew using animatronic heads.

Once they turned in their script, the studio informed Stern that while they liked the script, he was no longer going to be directing the film. Stern said in an interview: "They were planning to do it on, a medium-low budget, around $10-12 million, and they felt comfortable with me directing it at that level. Then when I handed it in, they liked it so much that they wanted to do it on a higher budget, and they needed a big-name director they could use the foreign presales, since Polygram, which owns Propaganda, is a foreign company."

Marco Brambilla, whose film Demolition Man was a major international hit, was brought on to take over directing. According to Stern, Brambilla's approach was going to involve the traditional half-man, half-wolf look, with FX to be created by Amalgamated Dynamics.

After a meeting with Brambilla, both Stern and Burns left and moved on to other projects, with Burns stating: "There wasn't any shouting or anything... but it was such a strange feeling. We'd been working on this for a year and a half, and put all this thought into it. He'd been on it for a week and was saying 'I don't think the ending works' and 'this scene's got to go'." Stern added, "We took pride in writing a villain that was somewhat charming and had a compelling argument because the great villains are the ones that have a great pitch and make you think 'wow, I can see the logic to this.' He just wanted a cartoon villain that was twirling his moustache and being all 'ultimate evil'."

The project was suspended for about two years. During that time multiple screenwriters were brought in by the studio to rewrite the script, additionally Brambilla stepped down as director, and was replaced by Anthony Waller, who had gained a cult following for his low-budget thriller Mute Witness. Upon joining the project, Waller rewrote the script.

The script was further reworked by Larry Brothers, Neal Purvis, and Robert Wade, with Purvis and Wade working on the script for six months, contributing the danger tour and the bungee jump off the Eiffel Tower, Purvis would state in an interview: "To go through all those years of drafts, with John Landis himself doing the first one, and then just toss the whole lot out of the window and say, 'You go off and do whatever you want as long as you keep it under a certain budget', was a bizarre thing to happen to something which could have been such a lucrative franchise".

After the arbitration process, the final screenplay credit went to Stern, Burns, and Waller.

=== Locations ===
Filming took place in Amsterdam, Luxembourg, Metz, and New York City, and on location in Paris.

=== Alternate endings ===
In an alternate ending, after Andy eats Claude (Pierre Cosso)'s heart, Serafine Pigot (Julie Delpy) has a vision of her stepfather Thierry Pigot (Thierry Lhermitte) in the back of an ambulance, explaining how he found a cure before his death. The closing scene shows Andy and Chris (Phil Buckman) visiting Serafine at a hospital, where she has given birth to a child, whose eyes shift to look like the werewolves'; another version of the alternate ending features Inspector LeDuc (Tom Novembre) in Chris's place at the hospital.

== Release ==
An American Werewolf in Paris opened theatrically in the United Kingdom on October 31, 1997, in the United States on December 25, and in France on May 6, 1998.

== Reception ==
=== Box office ===
In its opening weekend, the film ranked seventh in the United States and Canada box office and third among new releases, earning $7.6 million. By the end of its run, Paris grossed $26.6 million from a $25 million budget.

=== Critics ===
Upon its release, USA Today gave the film two out of four stars, citing unfunny gags, a "charmless" performance by lead actor Tom Everett Scott, and a failure to tap into the Parisian setting, though they praised Anthony Waller's direction. Russell Smith of The Austin Chronicle called An American Werewolf in Paris "a fast-paced, entertaining homage that recaptures a fair amount of the old lunatic energy and subversive humor [of the original]". He criticized that the characters often seem clueless in the face of obvious danger, but praised the fun and the special effects of transformation as "repulsively convincing". He gave it two and a half out of five stars. Writing for ReelViews, James Berardinelli derided the film's sitcom-level comedy, unintentionally humorous scares, and gratuitous nudity, but said the emotionally compelling performance by Julie Delpy and the occasional strong directorial strokes prevent it from succeeding as campy, "so bad it's good" entertainment. He gave it one and a half out of four stars.

Unlike its predecessor, which has Oscar-winning special make-up effects by Rick Baker, Paris relies heavily on CGI for its transformation effects and chase sequences, a common point of derision from most critics.

The film was nominated for Worst Sequel at the 1997 Stinkers Bad Movie Awards, but lost to Speed 2: Cruise Control.

John Landis, the director of An American Werewolf in London, said, "I was really disappointed when I saw that film, I thought it was lousy".

On Rotten Tomatoes, the film has an approval rating of 6% based on reviews from 31 critics, with an average rating of 3.7/10. The website's critical consensus reads, "Markedly inferior to its cult classic predecessor in every way, An American Werewolf in Paris is felled by the silver bullets of clumsy storytelling and chintzy special effects." On Metacritic, it has a score of 31 out of 100 based on reviews from 13 critics, indicating "generally unfavorable" reviews. Audiences polled by CinemaScore gave the film an average grade of "B-" on an A+ to F scale.

== Soundtrack ==
An American Werewolf in Paris

Soundtrack album by Various artists
- Released: September 23, 1997
- Recorded: 53:21
- Genres: Pop, Rock and Roll

A soundtrack for An American Werewolf in Paris was released on CD and cassette tape through Hollywood Records on September 23, 1997. It featured music from artists such as Bush, Better Than Ezra, and Cake. The film's soundtrack is largely responsible for the Bush song "Mouth" releasing as a single in October 1997, as it was featured prominently in the film and trailer. The single, marked as a release from the soundtrack, charted on several Billboard charts, including the Mainstream Rock Tracks and Modern Rock Tracks charts.

The soundtrack was on Billboard's Top Album Sales chart for five weeks but, at its peak, only placed at number 80.

The Smash Mouth song "Walkin' on the Sun" is in the film but not the soundtrack.

=== Track list ===
No.	Title	Writer(s)	Performer	Length
1.	"Mouth" (The Stingray Mix)	Gavin Rossdale	Bush	4:35
2.	"Psychosis"	Roger Clyne / Arthur Edwards	The Refreshments	5:45
3.	"Normal Town"	Kevin Griffin	Better Than Ezra	3:38
4.	"Never Gonna Give You Up"	Barry White	Cake	3:49
5.	"Sick Love"	Eddie Kurdziel / Jeff McDonald	Redd Kross	3:29
6.	"Break the Glass"	Grant Lukacinsky	The Suicide Machines	3:09
7.	"Human Torch"	Tony Scalzo	Fastball	2:42
8.	"Soup Kitchen"	Grant Shanahan	Eva Trout	4:02
9.	"Hardset Head"	cEvin Key / Nivek Ogre	Skinny Puppy	4:05
10.	"Turned Blue"	Jimmy Newquist	Caroline's Spine	3:03
11.	"Downtime"	Paul Andrews / Gareth Prosser / Dan Woodgate	Fat	3:35
12.	"Adrenaline"	Phunk Junkeez	Phunk Junkeez	2:24
13.	"If I Could (What I Would Do)"	Peter Daou / Vanessa Daou	Vanessa Daou	3:32
14.	"Loverbeast in Paris"	Smoove Diamonds	Smoove Diamonds	3:42
15.	"Theme from An American Werewolf in Paris"	Wilbert Hirsch	Wilbert Hirsch	1:51
