= Coventry Music Museum =

Museum in Coventry, England

Coordinates: 52.41028°N 1.48383°W

Coventry Music Museum (CMM) is a museum, art gallery, music records archive, and interactive media studio located on Walsgrave Road, Ball Hill, Coventry, England.

== Overview ==
The museum is an independent museum run by unpaid volunteers. It was the vision of music historian Peter Chambers and journalist Julie Chambers, who both serve as directors of the museum today. The museum went into business in 2010. It received £10,000 in funding from the Heritage Lottery in 2015 and has also received grants from the General Charity of the City of Coventry. The museum charges for admission.

The museum received its 40,000th visitor in 2023.

== Collections ==
The museum has collections and exhibitions containing a variety of musical apparatus, most notably from Coventry-born and based musicians and musical groups. These include an exhibit on 19th century comedian T. E. Dunville, a 1960s sound booth and the piano played by Hilda Woodward of the band Lieutenant Pigeon. There is a permanent display dedicated to Delia Derbyshire.

The Vauxhall Cresta used in the filming of the music video for The Specials' song "Ghost Town" is on exhibit in the museum. The museum is home to the entire output of 2 Tone Records, a record label founded by The Specials' Jerry Dammers – every single released by the label is available to view.

Paul King, lead vocalist for the 1980s band King, attended a 2011 special exhibition about his band. English rock band The Enemy has visited the museum.
