= List of glam rock artists =

This is a list of notable musical acts who pertain to the glam rock genre of music.

== Classic era of glam (1971–1976) ==
- ABBA
- Angel
- Arrows
- Bay City Rollers
- Blackfoot Sue
- Marc Bolan
- David Bowie
- Chicory Tip
- Alice Cooper
- Jayne County
- Donovan (briefly in the early 1970s)
- Doctors of Madness
- Brian Eno
- David Essex
- Bryan Ferry
- Geordie
- The Glitter Band
- Gary Glitter
- Alex Harvey
- Heavy Metal Kids
- Hello
- The Hollywood Stars
- John Howard
- Hush
- Iron Virgin
- Japan (early work)
- Jet
- Jobriath
- Elton John
- Kenny
- Kiss
- Magic Tramps
- New York Dolls
- Ney Matogrosso
- Metro
- Mott the Hoople
- Mud
- Paper Lace
- Pilot
- Iggy Pop
- Suzi Quatro
- Queen
- Lou Reed
- Alastair Riddell
- Mick Ronson
- Roxy Music
- The Rubettes
- Secos & Molhados
- Silverhead
- Skyhooks
- Slade
- Slik
- The Tubes
- Brett Smiley
- Space Waltz
- Sparks
- Alvin Stardust
- Steve Harley & Cockney Rebel
- Sweeney Todd
- Sweet
- T.Rex
- Magnus Uggla
- Vodka Collins
- Wizzard
- Roy Wood
- Zolar X

== Post-1976 glam ==
- The Ark
- The Darkness
- Doctor and the Medics
- Girl
- Hanoi Rocks
- Hot Leg
- King Adora
- The Medullary Paralysis
- Negative
- Prima Donna
- Pure Rubbish
- Robin Black and the I.R.S.
- Spacehog
- The Struts
- Suede
- Supergroupies
- White Hot Odyssey

== See also ==
- Glam metal
- List of glam metal bands and artists
