= A Cry in the Night =

A Cry in the Night may refer to:

- A Cry in the Night (novel), by Mary Higgins Clark
- "A Cry in the Night" (song), a 1989 song by Bonnie Bianco
- A Cry in the Night (1956 film), a film noir starring Edmond O'Brien, Brian Donlevy and Natalie Wood
- A Cry in the Night (1996 film), a film directed by Jean Beaudry
