= List of number-one hits of 1987 (Germany) =

This is a list of the German Media Control Top100 Singles Chart number-ones of 1987.

Key
†	Indicates best-performing single and album of 1987

Issue date	Song	Artist	Album	Artist
5 January	"Walk Like an Egyptian"	The Bangles	"Träumen mit Engelbert"	Engelbert
12 January	"Walk Like an Egyptian"	The Bangles	"Träumen mit Engelbert"	Engelbert
19 January	"Showing Out (Get Fresh at the Weekend)"	Mel and Kim	"Break Every Rule"	Tina Turner
26 January	"Showing Out (Get Fresh at the Weekend)"	Mel and Kim	"Break Every Rule"	Tina Turner
2 February	"Showing Out (Get Fresh at the Weekend)"	Mel and Kim	"The House of Blue Light"	Deep Purple
9 February	"Reality"	Richard Sanderson	"The House of Blue Light"	Deep Purple
16 February	"Reality"	Richard Sanderson	"The House of Blue Light"	Deep Purple
23 February	"Reality"	Richard Sanderson	"Definite 1964 - 1986"	Joe Cocker
2 March	"Reality"	Richard Sanderson	"Definite 1964 - 1986"	Joe Cocker
9 March	"Reality"	Richard Sanderson	"Heart Over Mind"	Jennifer Rush
16 March	"Stay"	Pierre Cosso & Bonnie Bianco	"Heart Over Mind"	Jennifer Rush
23 March	"Stay"	Pierre Cosso & Bonnie Bianco	"Heart Over Mind"	Jennifer Rush
30 March	"Stay"	Pierre Cosso & Bonnie Bianco	"Heart Over Mind"	Jennifer Rush
6 April	"Stay"	Pierre Cosso & Bonnie Bianco	"Heart Over Mind"	Jennifer Rush
13 April	"Respectable"	Mel and Kim	"Heart Over Mind"	Jennifer Rush
20 April	"Respectable"	Mel and Kim	"Heart Over Mind"	Jennifer Rush
27 April	"You're the Voice"	John Farnham	"Heart Over Mind"	Jennifer Rush
4 May	"You're the Voice"	John Farnham	"Heart Over Mind"	Jennifer Rush
11 May	"La Isla Bonita"	Madonna	"The Joshua Tree" †	U2
18 May	"La Isla Bonita"	Madonna	"The Joshua Tree" †	U2
25 May	"La Isla Bonita"	Madonna	"The Joshua Tree" †	U2
1 June	"La Isla Bonita"	Madonna	"The Joshua Tree" †	U2
8 June	"La Isla Bonita"	Madonna	"The Joshua Tree" †	U2
15 June	"I Wanna Dance with Somebody (Who Loves Me)"	Whitney Houston	"The Joshua Tree" †	U2
22 June	"I Wanna Dance with Somebody (Who Loves Me)"	Whitney Houston	"Whitney"	Whitney Houston
29 June	"I Wanna Dance with Somebody (Who Loves Me)"	Whitney Houston	"Whitney"	Whitney Houston
6 July	"I Wanna Dance with Somebody (Who Loves Me)"	Whitney Houston	"Whitney"	Whitney Houston
13 July	"I Wanna Dance with Somebody (Who Loves Me)"	Whitney Houston	"Whitney"	Whitney Houston
20 July	"It's a Sin"	Pet Shop Boys	"Whitney"	Whitney Houston
27 July	"It's a Sin"	Pet Shop Boys	"Whitney"	Whitney Houston
3 August	"It's a Sin"	Pet Shop Boys	"Whitney"	Whitney Houston
10 August	"It's a Sin"	Pet Shop Boys	"Whitney"	Whitney Houston
17 August	"It's a Sin"	Pet Shop Boys	"Whitney"	Whitney Houston
24 August	"It's a Sin"	Pet Shop Boys	"Whitney"	Whitney Houston
31 August	"Voyage Voyage" †	Desireless	"Whitney"	Whitney Houston
7 September	"Voyage Voyage" †	Desireless	"Who's That Girl"	Soundtrack / Madonna
14 September	"Voyage Voyage" †	Desireless	"Bad"	Michael Jackson
21 September	"Voyage Voyage" †	Desireless	"Bad"	Michael Jackson
28 September	"Voyage Voyage" †	Desireless	"Bad"	Michael Jackson
5 October	"Never Gonna Give You Up"	Rick Astley	"Bad"	Michael Jackson
12 October	"Never Gonna Give You Up"	Rick Astley	"Bad"	Michael Jackson
19 October	"Never Gonna Give You Up"	Rick Astley	"Bad"	Michael Jackson
26 October	"You Win Again"	Bee Gees	"E.S.P."	Bee Gees
2 November	"You Win Again"	Bee Gees	"E.S.P."	Bee Gees
9 November	"You Win Again"	Bee Gees	"E.S.P."	Bee Gees
16 November	"You Win Again"	Bee Gees	"E.S.P."	Bee Gees
23 November	"You Win Again"	Bee Gees	"E.S.P."	Bee Gees
30 November	"You Win Again"	Bee Gees	"E.S.P."	Bee Gees
7 December	"Whenever You Need Somebody"	Rick Astley	"E.S.P."	Bee Gees
14 December	"Whenever You Need Somebody"	Rick Astley	"E.S.P."	Bee Gees
21 December	"Whenever You Need Somebody"	Rick Astley	"Misteriosa Venezia"	Rondo Veneziano
28 December	No release (Note: Same issue as for 21 December.)			

== See also ==
- List of number-one hits (Germany)
