= Cinderella '80 =

1984 Italian romantic comedy film by Roberto Malenotti

- Italian theatrical release poster
- Directed by: Roberto Malenotti
- Cinematography: Dante Spinotti
- Music by: Guido & Maurizio De Angelis
- Release date: 1984
- Language: Italian

Cinderella '80 (Italian: Cenerentola '80) is a 1984 Italian romantic comedy film directed by Roberto Malenotti, based on the fairy tale of Cinderella. It was both released as a film (120min length) and as a TV-miniseries (with 206min length).

== Cast ==
- Bonnie Bianco as Cindy Cardone
- Pierre Cosso as Mizio/Prince Eugenio
- Adolfo Celi as Prince Gherardeschi
- Sylva Koscina as Princess Gherardeschi
- Vittorio Caprioli as Harry Cardone
- Sandra Milo as Marianne
- Kendal Kaldwell as Muriel Cardone
- Edy Angelillo as Carol Cardone
- Franco Caracciolo as Egisto Gherardeschi
- Jean-René Lemoine
