= Les Coeurs brûlés (miniseries) =

French television program

Les Coeurs brûlés "Burned Hearts", is a French miniseries in eight 90-minute episodes, produced by Jean Sagols a screenplay by Jean-Pierre Jaubert, Silbert Queen, and Jean-Charles Dudrumet. It was broadcast from 3 July 1992 to 21 August 1992 on TF1.

== Synopsis ==
Isa Mercier, a cashier in a supermarket is determined to leave her situation. Thanks to her uncle, she was hired as a maid at "La Réserve", one of the most beautiful palaces on the French Riviera, where Hélène Charrière reigns over the hotel.

== Cast ==
- Mireille Darc : Hélène Charrière
- Amélie Pick : Isa Mercier puis Leroy
- Pierre Cosso : Christian Leroy
- Danièle Évenou : Geneviève Mercier
- Michel Duchaussoy : Arnaud Charrière
- Alain Doutey : Jean-Philippe Vernier
- Magali Noël : Julia Bertyl
- Jacques Serres : Marcel Mercier
- Pierre Vaneck : Marc Leroy
- Josy Bernard : Patricia Leroy
- Patrice-Flora Praxo : Audrey Bertyl
- Frédéric Deban : Sylvain Roquière
- Rémy Roggero : Tanguy Mercier
- Dora Doll : Marie-Thérèse Fromentin
- Michel Robbe : Stéphane Romanski
- Cyril Aubin : Tonin

== Episodes ==
1. La Blessure The injury
2. Le Court-circuit The short circuit
3. L'Ambition Ambition
4. La Cassure The Break
5. Lutte d'intérêts Fighting interests
6. Quitte ou double Double or quits
7. Anges et démons Angels and Demons
8. L'Amour triomphant Triumphant love

== Comments ==
Broadcast on TF1 in the summer of 1992, this soap opera was seen by around 10 million spectators every Friday. Its credits are interpreted by Nicole Croisille. The success of this series spawned a sequel in 1994: Les Yeux d'Hélène. In September 2017, following the death of Mireille Darc, the Série Club channel rebroadcast the series.
