= Hilda Woodward =

British musician (1913–1999)

- Born: December 15, 1913; Coventry, Warwickshire, England
- Died: February 22, 1999 (aged 85) Coventry, Warwickshire, England
- Instrument: piano
- Formerly of: Lieutenant Pigeon

Hilda Woodward (née McCutchion, December 15, 1913 – February 22, 1999) was a British musician from Coventry. She is best known for playing the piano on the hit song "Mouldy Old Dough", by the band Lieutenant Pigeon.

== Early life ==
Woodward was born in Coventry, Warwickshire in 1913. She was raised in the former Canal Tavern pub, at the Coventry Canal Basin. During the 1960s, Woodward worked as a shorthand typist at Jaguar and performed in the evenings as the resident pianist at the Stoke Ex-Servicemen's Club. She also played on occasion with the Guildhall Operatic Society. Woodward then married, had children and worked as a music teacher in Coventry.

== Lieutenant Pigeon ==
Woodward's son Rob Woodward managed and fronted the band Lieutenant Pigeon, also playing the piano, guitar, tin whistle, and providing vocals. Other members were Nigel Fletcher on drums and Steven Johnson on bass. Woodward allowed the band to use her living room for rehearsals and as a recording studio, and was recruited to play piano and keyboard for the band.

In 1972, the band recorded "Mouldy Old Dough" in the living room studio, with Woodward playing a honky-tonk style on the piano. It was released by Decca Records as a single. The song became a novelty hit in Belgium, where it was being used as a TV news theme, then reached number one in the UK singles chart. It is the only British number one single to ever feature a mother and son and was the first song by a Coventry band to top that chart.

At the height of the songs success, Woodward became one of the oldest people to appear on the TV show Top of the Pops. The band followed "Mouldy Old Dough" with other songs and albums, such as "Goodbye" and "Desperate Dan", but none were as successful as their unexpected pop anthem. They did continue to tour, with the last performance of the original line-up, including Woodward, in Luxembourg during 1978.

Pete Chambers of the Coventry Music Museum has said about the song and Woodward that "it remains the only number one record to feature a mother and son in its line-up. Indeed, pianist Hilda Woodward, already in her sixties at the time, gave the band another angle of curiosity (if another one was needed) she also gave the band her front room to use as a studio." Woodward was in fact 57 when “Mouldy Old Dough” was recorded, and 58 when it was released.

Lieutenant Pigeon drummer and vocalist Nigel Fletcher had said that: “Hilda Woodward was reluctant to join in on her son’s novelty/instrumental band Lieutenant Pigeon. She always felt that the generation gap would have made her into something of an outsider. However, when she realised how welcoming everyone was when she appeared with the group, she much enjoyed being loved by everyone. In fact she never ever regretted her time in the limelight. No one had a bad word to say about Hilda. She was good fun and had a wonderful sense of humour".

== Death ==
Woodward died from pneumonia and chest complications in 1999 at Walsgrave Hospital, Coventry, aged 85.

== Legacy ==
Her piano has been housed in the collection of the Coventry Music Museum since 2019. A blue plaque was unveiled above the front door of Woodward's former home in Coventry in 2022.
