= Jean Sagols =

French actor, screenwriter and television director (1938–2026)

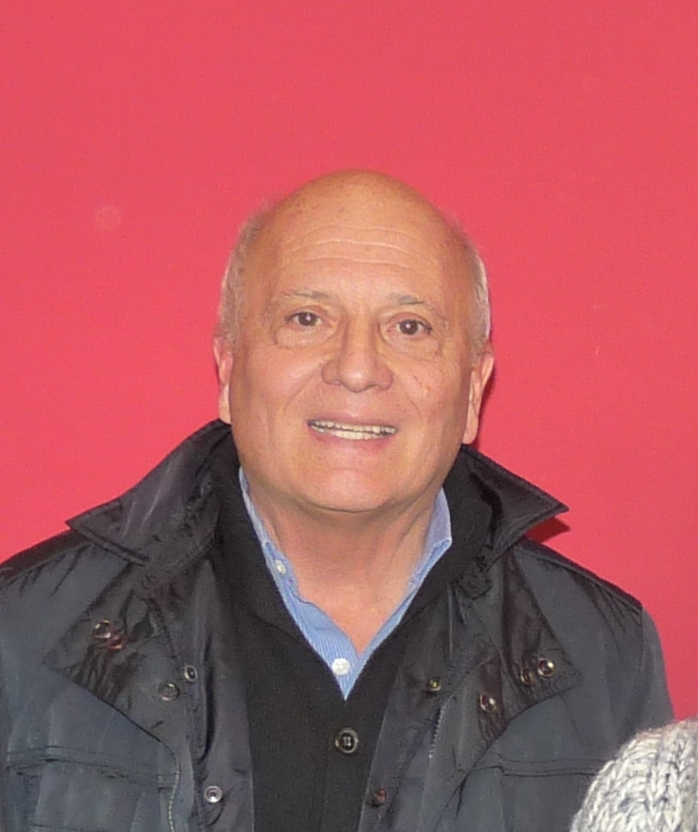
- Sagols in 2012
- Born: Jean André Marie Sagols; 15 August 1938; Perpignan, Pyrénées-Orientales, France
- Died: 26 March 2026 (aged 87); Perpignan, Pyrénées-Orientales, France
- Occupations: Actor; screenwriter; director
- Years active: 1964–2011

Jean André Marie Sagols (15 August 1938 – 26 March 2026) was a French actor, screenwriter and television director. He was the father of actor Thomas Sagols.

Sagols died from a cerebral haemorrhage on 26 March 2026, at the age of 87.

== Filmography ==
=== Actor ===
==== Television ====
- 1965: Le Roi Lear
- 1967: Les Habits noirs
- 1970: La Brigade des maléfices, episode La Septième Chaine
- 1972: La Sainte Farce
- 1973: Monsieur Émilien est mort
- 1974: Un curé de choc (26 episodes)
- 1974: Les Brigades du Tigre, episode Ce siècle avait sept ans
- 1974: L'Accusée
- 1975: Les Brigades du Tigre, épisode De la poudre et des balles

==== Film ====
- 1964: Cargo pour la Réunion
- 1966: The Second Twin
- 1967: Le crime de David Levinstein
- 1970: Heureux qui comme Ulysse
- 1974: Les Suspects

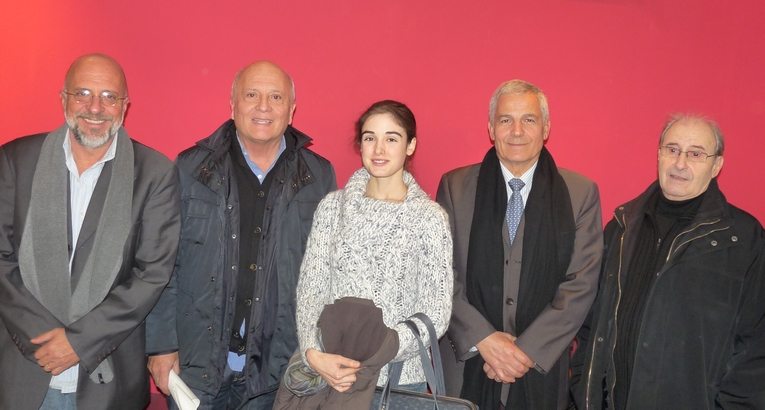
Jean Sagols with Katia Miran, the actress who plays Bernadette, with the Production team

=== Director ===
==== Television ====
- 2005: Mademoiselle Navarro
- 2004–2006: Navarro (6 episodes)
- 2003–2004: L'Instit (4 episodes)
- 1996: Terre indigo (8 episodes)
- 1995: Les filles du Lido (3 episodes)
- 1994: Les Yeux d'Hélène (9 episodes)
- 1993: Les Grandes Marées (8 episodes)
- 1992: Les Cœurs Brûlés (8 episodes)
- 1990: Marie Pervenche (2 episodes)
- 1990: Orages d'été, avis de tempête (9 episodes)
- 1989: Orages d'été (8 episodes)
- 1989: L'Agence
- 1988: Le Vent des moissons (7 episodes)
- 1986: Chahut Bahut
- 1982 and 1986: Cinéma 16 – 2 television films

==== Film ====
- 2011: Je m'appelle Bernadette
