= Killing Me Softly with His Song =

1971 song by Lori Lieberman and covered by Roberta Flack

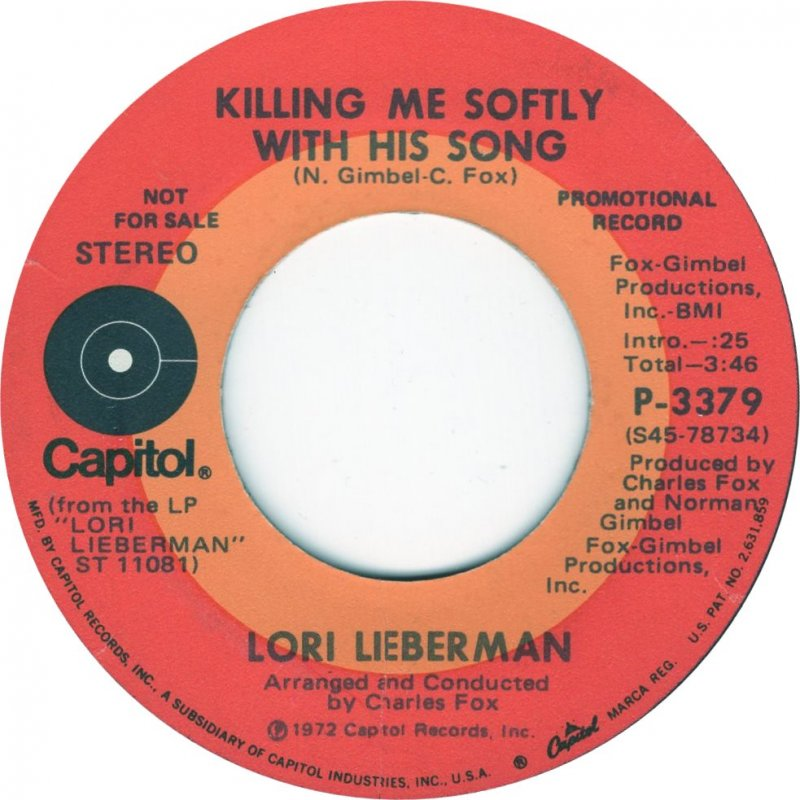
- Promotional 7-inch single, stereo version

Single by Lori Lieberman

from the album Lori Lieberman
- Released: 1972
- Recorded: Late 1971
- Genre: Folk
- Length: 3:46
- Label: Capitol
- Songwriters: Charles Fox; Norman Gimbel; Lori Lieberman (uncredited)
- Producers: Fox and Gimbel

Audio
- "Killing Me Softly With His Song – Lori Lieberman (1972)" on YouTube

"Killing Me Softly with His Song" is a song composed by Charles Fox with lyrics by Norman Gimbel. The lyrics were written in collaboration with Lori Lieberman after she was inspired by a Don McLean performance in late 1971. Denied writing credit by Fox and Gimbel, Lieberman released her version of the song in 1972, but it did not chart.

In 1973, it became a number-one hit in the United States, Australia, and Canada for Roberta Flack, and also reached number six on the UK Singles Chart. In 1996, the Fugees recorded the song with Lauryn Hill on lead vocals. Their version became a number-one hit in twenty countries including Germany, where it became the first single to debut atop the chart. The version by Flack won the 1974 Grammy for Record of the Year and Best Female Pop Vocal Performance. The version by the Fugees won the 1997 Grammy for Best R&B Performance by a Duo or Group with Vocal. Propelled by the success of the Fugees track, the 1972 recording by Roberta Flack was remixed in 1996 by Jonathan Peters, with Flack adding some new vocal flourishes; this version topped the Hot Dance Club Play chart.

Flack and the Fugees would go on to perform the song together. The versions by Roberta Flack and by the Fugees were both placed on the 2021 revised list of Rolling Stone's 500 Greatest Songs of All Time. According to Billboard, it is one of nearly a dozen songs to be Grammy nominated for Song of the Year that have had two versions reach the top 10 on the Billboard Hot 100.

After confirming Lieberman's contribution for decades, around 1997 Fox and Gimbel changed their story about the song's origins to downplay her role. Gimbel threatened McLean with a lawsuit in 2008, demanding he remove from his website an assertion that McLean was the inspiration for "Killing Me Softly", but McLean responded by showing Gimbel the latter's own words confirming the inspiration, published in 1973.

== Lori Lieberman version ==
Aspiring musician Lori Lieberman was 19 years old in 1971 when she was introduced to veteran songwriter Norman Gimbel and composer Charles Fox. The two men signed her to a management contract, under which they would write her songs, manage her career and take 20% of her income. The three shared a Jewish heritage and Scorpio astrological signs, and they began to pool songwriting ideas. Gimbel also began an affair with the 19-year-old Lieberman, even though he was 43 years old and married. The affair was kept secret for years.

In November 1971, Lieberman, then 20, and her friend Michele Willens (the daughter of millionaire Harold Willens) attended a Don McLean performance at the Troubadour nightclub in West Hollywood. McLean's hit song "American Pie" was rising in the charts, but Lieberman was strongly affected by McLean singing another song: "Empty Chairs". That song spurred her to write poetic notes on a paper napkin while he was performing the song. Willens has confirmed that Lieberman was "scribbling notes" on a napkin as soon as McLean began singing the song.

After the concert, Lieberman phoned Gimbel to read him her napkin notes and share her experience of a singer reaching deep inside her world with his song. Lieberman's description reminded Gimbel of a song title that was already in his idea notebook: "killing us softly with some blues". The phrase had appeared five years earlier in the novel Hopscotch by Julio Cortázar: "and Ronald was left alone at the piano, with all the time in the world to woodshed some of his bop ideas or to kill us softly with some blues." Gimbel expanded on Lieberman's notes, fleshing them out into song lyrics. Gimbel said in 1973: "Her conversation fed me, inspired me, gave me some language and a choice of words." Gimbel passed the lyrics to Fox, who set them to music.

Lieberman recorded the song in late 1971 and released it as a single in 1972, produced by Gimbel and Fox. That version did not chart. Lieberman promoted the album by touring, and she always introduced "Killing Me Softly" by describing its origin in the McLean performance. Gimbel and Fox even wrote that introduction of the song for her, so that she could deliver it consistently at each performance. In 1973, in her first appearance on national television, Lieberman described the same origin story on The Mike Douglas Show, after performing the song. When Lieberman toured through Canada in 1974 to promote her second album, Billboard magazine carried a public relations piece from Capitol Records about the three-way "song-producing team" of Lieberman/Gimbel/Fox, including a description of the Don McLean performance inspiring the song "Killing Me Softly". Gimbel was quoted saying that he relied on Lieberman to inspire his songwriting creativity since he had passed the most creative days of his youth: "Now I need a reason to write, and Lori is one of the best reasons a lyricwriter could have."

Don McLean said in 1973 that he was surprised to find out that the song described his singing:

I'm absolutely amazed. I've heard both Lori's and Roberta's version and I must say I'm very humbled about the whole thing. You can't help but feel that way about a song written and performed as well as this one is.

=== Disputed origin ===
In the 1970s, both Gimbel and Fox were in agreement with Lieberman about the song's origin at a McLean concert. Sean Derek, who worked for Gimbel and Fox as an assistant in the 1970s, confirmed that the two men would tell the McLean origin story "all the time". However, Gimbel and Fox changed their stories around 1997, to reduce or dismiss Lieberman's contribution.

In 1976, the Lieberman/Gimbel/Fox songwriting team turned sour. Gimbel had divorced his wife three years earlier, but Lieberman eventually stopped the sexual relationship she had with Gimbel because he "had become emotionally abusive, controlling and unfaithful". She asked to be freed of her contract. Gimbel and Fox directed their lawyers to demand US$27,000 from Lieberman to pay expenses (equivalent to $153,000 in 2025), and to demand another US$250,000 of her future income (equivalent to $1,414,000 in 2025), effectively killing her career. Lieberman's lawyer, Frederic Ansis, recalled later that Gimbel and Fox could have been "nice guys" like other managers in the industry who released their unsuccessful artists without onerous payments, but they chose the other route.

By 1997, Lieberman had long severed her ties to Gimbel, but she reconnected with Fox, who attended a concert of hers. That same year, Lieberman was interviewed by The New York Times about her recent songwriting work. In this interview she said that when she was young, Gimbel and Fox had been "very, very controlling. I felt like I was pushed on stage, and I was singing other people's material, although that material was based on my private diaries. I felt victimized for most of my early career." Fox never spoke to her again after that revelation.

In 2008, Gimbel demanded that McLean remove text from his website saying that McLean was the inspiration for "Killing Me Softly". McLean did not remove the text, and McLean's lawyer sent Gimbel a copy of a 1973 New York Daily News article in which Gimbel was quoted and seemed to agree with Lieberman's account. In the article, Lieberman was asked how the song came about and what its inspiration was:

Don McLean [...] I saw him at the Troubadour in LA last year. I had heard about him from some friends but up to then all I knew about him really was what others had told me. But I was moved by his performance, by the way he developed his numbers, he got right through to me.

Gimbel's contribution supports Lieberman's stance:

Lori is only 20 and she really is a very private person [...] She told us about this strong experience she had listening to McLean [...] I had a notion this might make a good song so the three of us discussed it. We talked it over several times, just as we did with the rest of the numbers we wrote for the album and we all felt it had possibilities.

Lieberman then adds:

Norman had a phrase he liked, 'killing me softly with his blues' [...] But I didn't feel the word "blues" was quite what the effect was. It wasn't contemporary enough, somehow. We talked about it a while and finally decided on the word "song" instead. It seemed right then when we did it.

Fox published a memoir in 2010, Killing Me Softly, My Life in Music, which contained nothing about the McLean performance inspiring the song, and downplayed Lieberman's role in the songwriting team. When Dan MacIntosh of Songfacts asked Fox in 2010 about the McLean origin story, Fox said: "I think it's called an urban legend. It really didn't happen that way." He described Gimbel and himself writing the song, then playing it for Lieberman later, who was reminded of McLean's singing. Fox said that "somehow the words got changed around so that we wrote it based on Don McLean..."

Gimbel described in 2010 how he had been introduced to the Argentinian-born composer Lalo Schifrin (then of Mission: Impossible fame) and began writing songs to a number of Schifrin's films. Both Gimbel and Schifrin made a suggestion to write a Broadway musical together, and Schifrin gave Gimbel an Argentinean novel—Hopscotch by Julio Cortázar—to read as a possible idea. In chapter two, the narrator describes himself as sitting in a bar listening to an American pianist friend "kill us softly with some blues". Gimbel put the phrase in his notebook of song ideas for use at a future time.

Lieberman released a song in 2011 called "Cup of Girl" with lyrics about being used by someone who would "rifle through her diary" to write songs about her, who was dishonest, promiscuous, and took advantage of her. Lieberman says that Gimbel contacted her after the song was published, sending angry emails, but Lieberman deleted the emails instead of responding to them. Gimbel died in 2018.

In 2020, Lieberman said she was not seeking money or official songwriting credit, she just wanted the world to know the correct origin of the song.

== Roberta Flack version ==
"Killing Me Softly with His Song"
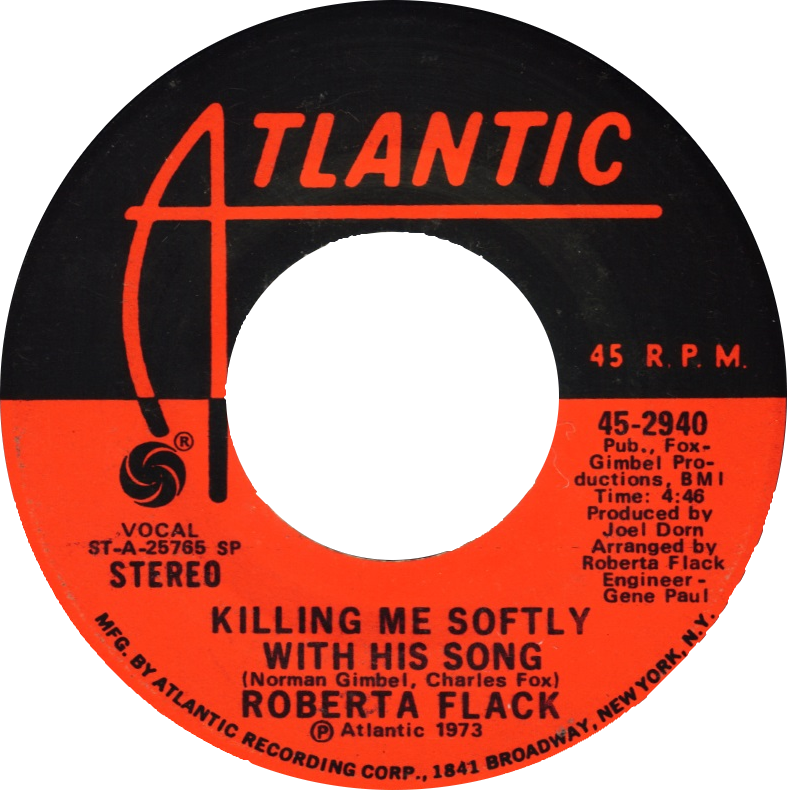
- One of A-side labels of U.S. vinyl single

Single by Roberta Flack

from the album Killing Me Softly
- B-side: "Just Like a Woman"
- Released: January 22, 1973
- Recorded: 1972
- Studio: Atlantic, New York City
- Genre: R&B; soul jazz
- Length: 4:46
- Label: Atlantic
- Songwriters: Charles Fox; Norman Gimbel; Lori Lieberman (uncredited)
- Producer: Joel Dorn

Roberta Flack singles chronology
"Where Is the Love" (1972)	"Killing Me Softly with His Song" (1973)	"Jesse" (1973)

Alternative release
- West German single picture sleeve

Audio
- "Killing Me Softly with His Song" on YouTube

Lieberman was the first to record the song in late 1971, releasing it in early 1972. Helen Reddy has said she was sent the song, but "the demo... sat on my turntable for months without being played because I didn't like the title".

Roberta Flack first heard the song on an airplane, when the Lieberman original was featured on the in-flight audio program. After scanning the listing of available audio selections, Flack would recall: "The title, of course, smacked me in the face. I immediately pulled out some scratch paper, made musical staves [then] play[ed] the song at least eight to ten times jotting down the melody that I heard. When I landed, I immediately called Quincy [Jones] at his house and asked him how to meet Charles Fox. Two days later I had the music." Shortly afterwards Flack rehearsed the song with her band in the Tuff Gong Studios in Kingston, Jamaica, but did not release it. She was unhappy with the background vocals on the various mixes she auditioned. Atlantic executive Tunc Erim assured her it would be a hit song no matter which mix was released. She refused, recalling later that she "wanted to be satisfied with that record more than anything else."

In September 1972, Flack was opening for Quincy Jones at the Los Angeles Greek Theater; after performing her prepared encore song, Flack was advised by Quincy Jones to sing an additional song. Flack recalled, "I said 'Well, I have this new song I've been working on'... After I finished, the audience would not stop screaming. And Quincy said, 'Ro, don't sing that daggone song no more until you record it.'"

Released in January 1973, Flack's version spent a total of five non-consecutive weeks at number one in February and March, more weeks than any other record in 1973. Billboard ranked it as the No. 3 song for 1973.

Charles Fox suggested that Flack's version was more successful than Lieberman's because Flack's "version was faster and she gave it a strong backbeat that wasn't in the original". According to Flack: "My classical background made it possible for me to try a number of things with [the song's arrangement]. I changed parts of the chord structure and chose to end on a major chord. [The song] wasn't written that way." The single appeared as the opening track of her Killing Me Softly album, issued in August 1973.

Flack won the 1973 Grammy Award for Record of the Year and Best Female Pop Vocal Performance, for the single, with Gimbel and Fox earning the Song of the Year Grammy.

In 1996, a house remix of Flack's version went to number one on the US dance chart.

In 1999, Flack's version was inducted into the Grammy Hall of Fame. It ranked number 360 on Rolling Stone's list of The 500 Greatest Songs of All Time and number 82 on Billboard's greatest songs of all time.

=== Personnel ===
Credits are adapted from AllMusic.

- Roberta Flack – vocals, pianos, rhythm track arrangement
- Donny Hathaway – harmony vocals
- Eric Gale – guitars
- Ron Carter – bass
- Grady Tate – drums
- Ralph MacDonald – congas, percussion, tambourine

=== Charts ===
==== Weekly charts ====
Chart (1973–1996)	Peak position
Argentina	4
Australia (Kent Music Report)	1
Austria (Ö3 Austria Top 40)	19
Canada Top Singles (RPM)	1
Canada Adult Contemporary (RPM)	1
Ireland (IRMA)	10
Japan (Oricon)	24
Netherlands (Dutch Top 40)	3
New Zealand (Listener)	1
Norway (VG-lista)	4
Switzerland (Schweizer Hitparade)	32
UK Singles (OCC)	6
US Billboard Hot 100	1
US Best Selling Soul Singles (Billboard)	2
US Easy Listening (Billboard)	2
West Germany (GfK)	30

Chart (2023)	Peak position
US R&B Digital Song Sales (Billboard)	1

Chart (2025)	Peak position
Israel International Airplay (Media Forest)	3
US R&B/Hip-Hop Digital Song Sales (Billboard)	3

==== Year-end charts ====
Chart (1973)	Position
US Billboard Hot 100	3

==== All-time charts ====
Chart (1958–2018)	Position
US Billboard Hot 100	102

=== Certifications ===
Region	Certification	Certified units/sales
New Zealand (RMNZ)	Gold	15,000^{‡}
Spain (Promusicae)	Platinum	60,000^{‡}
United Kingdom (BPI)	Gold	400,000^{‡}
United States (RIAA)	Gold	1,000,000^{^}
^{^} Shipments figures based on certification alone.^{‡} Sales+streaming figures based on certification alone.

== Fugees version ==
"Killing Me Softly"

Single by Fugees

from the album The Score
- Released: April 23, 1996
- Genre: R&B; hip-hop soul
- Length: 4:58 (album version); 4:16 (radio edit); 4:00 (radio edit without intro)
- Label: Ruffhouse; Columbia
- Songwriters: Charles Fox; Norman Gimbel; Lori Lieberman (uncredited)
- Producer: Fugees

Fugees singles chronology
"Fu-Gee-La" (1996)	"Killing Me Softly" (1996)	"Ready or Not" (1996)

Music video
- "Killing Me Softly" on YouTube

The American hip-hop group the Fugees released their version of the song (titled "Killing Me Softly") on their second album, The Score (1996), with Lauryn Hill singing the lead vocals. The Fugees' version, released to US radio on April 23, 1996, by Ruffhouse and Columbia Records, became an international hit, topping most of the airplay and sales charts it appeared on. In the United States, it did not appear on the Billboard Hot 100 because it was not released as a commercial single there, which was a rule at the time. It instead reached number two on the Billboard Hot 100 Airplay chart and number one on the Hot R&B Airplay chart. The song ended up being the 7th most-played song on US radio stations in 1996. It has been certified triple-platinum by the Recording Industry Association of America (RIAA) for sales and streaming figures of approximately three million units in the US.

In the United Kingdom, "Killing Me Softly" broke the record at the time for the most radio plays in a single week. Additionally, it was the United Kingdom's best-selling single of 1996, and remains the country's biggest hip-hop song by a group, and one of the best-selling singles of all time in the United Kingdom. In Germany, it became the first single to debut at number one, was the best-selling single of the year, and remains one of the best selling singles of all time. It was also the best-selling single of 1996 in Belgium, Iceland, and the Netherlands. "Killing Me Softly" was also among the best-selling songs in France, during the 1990s.

This version sampled the 1990 song "Bonita Applebum" by A Tribe Called Quest, which itself samples the riff from the song "Memory Band" by Rotary Connection. The Fugees' single was so successful that the track was pulled from retailers while it was still in the top 20, in an effort to draw attention to the Fugees' next single "Ready or Not". The Fugees' version won the 1997 Grammy for Best R&B Performance by a Duo or Group with Vocal, and their music video, directed by Aswad Ayinde, won the MTV Video Music Award for Best R&B Video.

=== Background ===
"Killing Me Softly" was the last song the Fugees recorded for The Score, after member Pras made the suggestion to cover it. They wanted to "see how we can create break beats. And of course, we all love A Tribe Called Quest and we went in like 'Okay, let's cut that sample.'" They then added a bass reggae drop. Initially, the Fugees wanted to change the lyrics of the song to make it anti-drugs and anti-poverty but the songwriters, Norman Gimbel and Charles Fox, refused.

=== Composition ===
The Fugees' version features "percussive rhythms" with "a synth sitar sound, Wyclef's blurted chants, Hill's vocal melisma on the scatted bridge, and a bombastic drum-loop track".

=== Critical reception ===
J.D. Considine from The Baltimore Sun felt that Lauryn Hill's rendition of "Killing Me Softly" "is so convincing, you'd think it was a sample." Celebrating the album's 20th anniversary in February 2016, Kenneth Partridge from Billboard said, "It's a lovely cover that maintains the spirit of the original while taking the material in new directions." Upon the release, the magazine's Larry Flick viewed it as a "crafty cover". Peter Miro from Cash Box stated that the trio's reworking of the Roberta Flack standard "succeeds wildly." He explained, "Basically they dropped a new rasta engine in the ballad for the diddly-bopping, head-nodding masses. Bet this will be the only version they think exists." Another Cash Box editor, Gil L. Robertson IV, named it a "standout track" of The Score album. Simon Price from Melody Maker felt that Hill is "sweet like Candi Staton", "singing a gorgeous a cappella version".

Alan Jones from Music Week deemed it "a sensational update", adding that it "touches myriad musical bases, appealing equally to pop, R&B, easy listening and dance fans. Stripped to its bare bones, it is beautifully sung, with just enough rapping to set it apart from the original. The whole thing is superbly underlined by a bumping bass and percussion. Simple, refreshing and a huge hit." James Hamilton from the Record Mirror Dance Update noted it as a "plaintive girl and muttering chaps' sparse bass bumped and sitar plinked but still tenderly crooned remake". Jordan Paramor from Smash Hits gave it five out of five and named it Best New Single, writing, "This is one hell of a track with the ability to blow your pants off and into space with the velocity of a rocket. Smoother than David Wicks' chat-up lines, and a million times more endearing, this soulful hip-hop number can have the entire Smash Hits office sighing and swaying their heads in euphoric pleasure within the first three beats. Originally performed by Roberta Flack (who?) in 1973, when it reached No.3, it deserves to go all the way to No.1 this time round. Bloody brilliant." In January 1997, Spin described the song as "an instant classic, pumped out of every passing car from coast to coast, with Lauryn Hill's timeless voice never losing its poignant kick".

=== Music video ===
The accompanying music video for "Killing Me Softly", directed by Aswad Ayinde and based on Lauryn Hill's ideas, won an MTV Video Music Award for Best R&B Video. The video depicts the trio watching a movie in a cinema. It also features a cameo of Roberta Flack.

=== Impact and legacy ===
"Killing Me Softly" was hailed as one of the most essential hip-hop songs in history by XXL. In autumn 2008, VH1 placed it at No. 25 on their list of the "100 Greatest Hip Hop Songs". In 2021, Rolling Stone included it in their revised list of the 500 Greatest Songs of All Time. The song experienced a resurgence in popularity on the social networking app TikTok, during the early 2020s. Their version has been sampled by French Montana, Baby Keem, and Mariah Carey. In October 2023, Billboard ranked "Killing Me Softly" among the "500 Best Pop Songs of All Time".

=== Bounty Killer remix ===
The Fugees recorded a dancehall version with Bounty Killer rapping, and Hill singing a rewritten chorus. However, they did not receive permission to release it on The Score.

=== Track listing ===
- UK CD1
1. "Killing Me Softly" (Album Version W/Out Intro) – 4:03
2. "Killing Me Softly" (Album Instrumental) – 4:03
3. "Cowboys" (Album Version) – 3:35
4. "Nappy Heads" (Remix) – 3:49
- UK CD2
1. "Killing Me Softly" (Album Version With Intro) – 4:16
2. "Fu-Gee-La" (Refugee Camp Global Mix) – 4:15
3. "Vocab" (Refugees Hip Hop Mix) – 4:07
4. "Vocab" (Salaam's Acoustic Remix) – 5:54

=== Charts ===
==== Weekly charts ====
Chart (1996)	Peak position
Australia (ARIA)	1
Austria (Ö3 Austria Top 40)	1
Belgium (Ultratop 50 Flanders)	1
Belgium (Ultratop 50 Wallonia)	1
Canada Top Singles (RPM)	6
Canada Adult Contemporary (RPM)	6
Canada Dance/Urban (RPM)	1
Croatia (HR Top 40)	1
Czech Republic (IFPI CR)	1
Denmark (IFPI)	1
Estonia (Eesti Top 20)	3
Europe (Eurochart Hot 100)	1
Europe (European Dance Radio)	1
Europe (European Hit Radio)	1
Finland (Suomen virallinen lista)	1
France (SNEP)	1
France Airplay (Music & Media)	1
Germany (GfK)	1
Hungary (Mahasz)	1
Hungary Airplay (HCRA)	1
Iceland (Íslenski Listinn Topp 40)	1
Ireland (IRMA)	1
Israel (Israeli Singles Chart)	1
Italy (Musica e dischi)	1
Italy Airplay (Music & Media)	6
Netherlands (Dutch Top 40)	1
Netherlands (Single Top 100)	1
New Zealand (Recorded Music NZ)	1
Norway (VG-lista)	1
Scottish Singles Sales (Official Charts)	1
Spain (AFYVE)	2
Spain Airplay (Music & Media)	1
Sweden (Sverigetopplistan)	1
Sweden (Swedish Dance Chart)	1
Switzerland (Schweizer Hitparade)	1
UK Singles (Official Charts)	1
UK Hip Hop/R&B (Official Charts)	1
UK Airplay (Music Week)	1
US Radio Songs (Billboard)	2
US Adult Contemporary (Billboard)	30
US Adult Pop Airplay (Billboard)	20
US Dance Club Songs (Billboard)	48
US Pop Airplay (Billboard)	1
US R&B/Hip-Hop Airplay (Billboard)	1
US Rhythmic Airplay (Billboard)	1
Zimbabwe (ZIMA)	1

==== Year-end charts ====
Chart (1996)	Position
Australia (ARIA)	2
Austria (Ö3 Austria Top 40)	2
Belgium (Ultratop 50 Flanders)	2
Belgium (Ultratop 50 Wallonia)	1
Canada Top Singles (RPM)	43
Canada Adult Contemporary (RPM)	72
Canada Dance/Urban (RPM)	2
Europe (Eurochart Hot 100)	4
France (SNEP)	5
Germany (Media Control)	1
Iceland (Íslenski Listinn Topp 40)	1
Israel (Israeli Singles Chart)	3
Italy (Musica e dischi)	2
Netherlands (Dutch Top 40)	4
Netherlands (Single Top 100)	1
New Zealand (RIANZ)	2
Norway (VG-lista)	1
Sweden (Topplistan)	2
Sweden (Swedish Dance Chart)	16
Switzerland (Schweizer Hitparade)	6
UK Singles (OCC)	1
UK Airplay (Music Week)	8
US Hot 100 Airplay (Billboard)	10
US Hot R&B Airplay (Billboard)	5
US Top 40/Mainstream (Billboard)	11
US Top 40/Rhythm-Crossover (Billboard)	2

==== Decade-end charts ====
Chart (1990–1999)	Position
Austria (Ö3 Austria Top 40)	51
Belgium (Ultratop 50 Flanders)	20
Netherlands (Dutch Top 40)	80
UK Singles (OCC)	8

==== All-time charts ====
Chart	Position
UK Singles (OCC)	46

=== Certifications and sales ===
Region	Certification	Certified units/sales
Australia (ARIA)	3× Platinum	210,000^{^}
Austria (IFPI Austria)	Platinum	50,000^{*}
Belgium (BRMA)	Platinum	50,000^{*}
Denmark (IFPI Danmark)	Platinum	90,000^{‡}
France (SNEP)	Platinum	650,000
Germany (BVMI)	2× Platinum	1,000,000^{^}
Italy (FIMI)	Platinum	100,000^{‡}
Netherlands (NVPI)	2× Platinum	150,000^{^}
New Zealand (RMNZ)	Platinum	10,000^{*}
Norway (IFPI Norway)	Platinum	
Spain (Promusicae)	Platinum	60,000^{‡}
Sweden (GLF)	Platinum	50,000^{^}
Switzerland (IFPI Switzerland)	Gold	25,000^{^}
United Kingdom (BPI)	3× Platinum	1,800,000^{‡}
United States (RIAA)	3× Platinum	3,000,000^{‡}
^{*} Sales figures based on certification alone.^{^} Shipments figures based on certification alone.^{‡} Sales+streaming figures based on certification alone.

=== Release history ===
Region	Date	Format(s)	Label(s)	Ref.
United States	April 23, 1996	Contemporary hit radio	Ruffhouse; Columbia	
United Kingdom	May 27, 1996	CD; cassette	Ruffhouse; Columbia	

== Appearances in other media ==
In Daredevil: Born Again, the Roberta Flack version appears during a scene where Matthew Murdock is being hunted down in a hospital after being shot saving one of his villains.

== See also ==
- List of number-one singles in Australia during the 1970s
- List of RPM number-one singles of 1973
- List of number-one singles in 1973 (New Zealand)
- List of Hot 100 number-one singles of 1973 (U.S.)
- List of number-one singles in Australia during the 1990s
- List of number-one hits of 1996 (Austria)
- List of Dutch Top 40 number-one singles of 1996
- List of European number-one hits of 1996
- List of number-one hits of 1996 (France)
- List of number-one singles of 1996 (Ireland)
- List of number-one singles in 1996 (New Zealand)
- List of number-one singles from the 1990s (UK)
- List of number-one dance singles of 1996 (U.S.)
- List of Mainstream Top 40 number-one hits of 1996 (U.S.)
- List of Billboard Rhythmic number-one songs of the 1990s
