= The Guilty (2000 film) =

2000 American crime film

- DVD cover
- Directed by: Anthony Waller
- Written by: William Davies; Simon Burke
- Starring: Bill Pullman; Devon Sawa
- Cinematography: Tobias A. Schliessler
- Edited by: Alison Grace
- Music by: Debbie Wiseman
- Distributed by: J&M Entertainment
- Release date: June 1, 2000 (Hungary)
- Running time: 108 minutes
- Country: United States
- Language: English

The Guilty is a 2000 American crime film directed by Anthony Waller and starring Bill Pullman, Devon Sawa, Gabrielle Anwar, Angela Featherstone and Joanne Whalley. The film is a remake of the 1992 UK two-part telemovie of the same name.

== Plot ==
Callum Crane is a high-powered lawyer in line for an appointment to the federal bench, during the same week he rapes new secretary Sophie at his office. Sophie threatens to go public with the assault if Crane does not turn down the judicial appointment. Crane resolves to hire a hit man to kill Sophie before she can go to the police. However, instead of hiring a professional for the job, he hires Nathan Corrigan, a young and callow ex-convict.

Crane gives Nathan an envelope of cash and Sophie's photo. Nathan tells his friends about the assignment and throws away the envelope. Instead of carrying out the hit, Nathan gets to know Sophie and ends up falling in love with her. One of Nathan's friends who is in need of money retrieves the envelope and sets out to kill Sophie himself. Nathan also has a secret of his own about his connection to Crane.

== Cast ==
- Bill Pullman as Callum Crane
- Devon Sawa as Nathan Corrigan
- Gabrielle Anwar as Sophie Lennon
- Angela Featherstone as Tanya Duncan
- Joanne Whalley as Natalie Crane
- Darcy Belsher as Dennis
- Jaimz Woolvett as Leo
- Ken Tremblett as Brent Frazer
- Gillian Barber as Maddy Corrigan
- Duncan Fraser as Martin Corrigan
- Bruce Harwood as Miles
- Hiro Kanagawa as Police Detective
- Garry Chalk as Police Chief
- Tegan Moss as Faith
- Taylor Anne Reid as Amy (as Taylor-Anne Reid)
- Camilla Overbye Roos as Selena Russell
- Judith Maxie as Judge
- Michelle Harrison as Crane's Assistant

== Critical reception ==
Writing for Reel Film Reviews, David Nusair praised how the film appears to be standard TV-movie fare, but later gives way to unpredictable plot twists and turns. Christabel Padmore of Apollo Guide called it a "modestly entertaining thriller" and wrote, "Pullman so often plays warm fuzzy characters, that it seems quite a stretch for him to a play ruthless and evil lawyer. And he just barely pulls it off. It's only when Crane shows a smidgen of compassion that Pullman's performance really starts to work." TV Guide gave a negative review criticizing the contrivances and convolutions of the plot.
