= Velvet Tinmine =

Compilation album by Various Artists
- Released: February 2003
- Genre: pop rock, glam rock,
- Label: RPM

Professional ratings
Review scores
Source	Rating
AllMusic	4.5/5 stars

Velvet Tinmine is a compilation album consisting of 20 obscure, yet high quality, British pop rock tracks from the glam rock era (period roughly between 1973 and 1975). Composed of forgotten album tracks and almost hit singles, most of these songs have not been released outside of the UK prior to this 2003 compilation.

== Track listing ==
1. "Rebels Rule" - Iron Virgin
2. "Another School Day" - Hello
3. "Let’s Get The Party Going" - Warwick
4. "Morning Bird" - The Damned (NOT the later punk band of the same name)
5. "Kick Your Boots Off" - Sisters
6. "Big Wheels Turning" - Flame
7. "Toughen Up" - Arrows
8. "Let's Do It Again" - Crunch
9. "Rock Star" - Bearded Lady
10. "(Baby) I Gotta Go" - Simon Turner
11. "Va Va Va Voom" - Brett Smiley
12. "Love Machine" - Shakane
13. "The Comets Are Coming" - Washington Flyers
14. "Slippery Rock 70s" - Stavely Makepeace
15. "Neo City" - Plod
16. "I Wanna Go To A Disco" - Ricky Wilde
17. "Bay City Rollers We Love You" - Tartan Horde
18. "Shake A Tail" - Big Wheel
19. "Wild Thing" - Fancy
20. "Kick Out the Jams" - Tubthumper
