= Ball Hill =

Area within the Stoke district of Coventry, West Midlands, England

Coordinates: 52.411°N 1.482°W

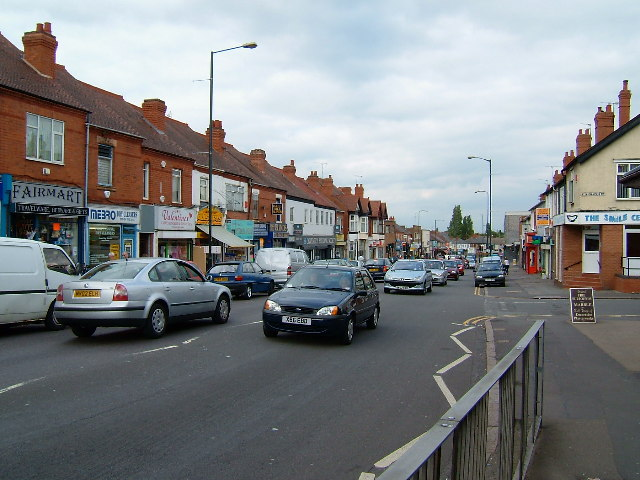
Ball Hill

Ball Hill is a locality within the Stoke district of Coventry, West Midlands, England. It is situated to the east of Coventry city centre with Walsgrave Road being the main thoroughfare through the area.

The term “Ball Hill” is most commonly applied to the commercial frontage along Walsgrave Road, which extends from the summit of the hill eastwards to the junction with Clay Lane and Brays Lane. Walsgrave Road forms a major arterial route linking the city centre with Leicester and the north‑east of England. After leaving the centre, it passes Gosford Green—approximately 0.5 miles to the east—before entering Ball Hill just over 200 yards further along the road.

The name seems most likely to have derived from the Old Ball Hotel, still standing at the top of the hill. However, prior to the early 20th century, the hill was known as Stoke Knob and was mainly residential until most of the dwellings were converted into shops.

The 2-Tone Village and the Coventry Music Museum are located on Walsgrave Road.
