= Iron Virgin =

Scottish glam rock band

Iron Virgin were a Scottish glam rock band of the 1970s. Their early stage garb has been compared to A Clockwork Orange, with their later stage costumes similar to American football uniforms, but with added iron chastity belts.

The band formed in Edinburgh, Scotland, in 1972 where they were discovered by Decca Records producer Nick Tauber and signed to the label's "progressive" offshoot, Deram. Their first single was "Jet", a cover from Paul McCartney's Band on the Run album. Recorded in December 1973, the song was released in February 1974. It was getting exposure until McCartney himself issued his version as a single, effectively smothering Iron Virgin's recording.

Their second, and best known single was "Rebels Rule", from their 1974 album of the same name. It scored reasonable reviews and a variation called "Stand Up for Kenny Everett" was often played on the BBC by the DJ of the title. The song has been described as "A brilliantly bombastic ode to teenage anarchy; the single's commercial failure is one of the great mysteries of its era". "Rebels Rule" was influential on the all-girl glam punk band The Runaways when they made their song "California Paradise" from their 1977 album Queens of Noise.

Iron Virgin's music has been re-released on compilation CDs such as the 2003 album Velvet Tinmine, part of the 'Junkshop' collection of discs released by RPM Records that focused on glam bands from the early 1970s whose output never, or barely, charted.

== Members ==
- Stuart Harper – vocals
- Gordon Nicol – Guitar
- Lawrie Riva – Guitar
- Marshall Bain – Bass
- John Lovatt – drums

== See also ==
- List of glam rock bands
