= Anthony Waller =

Lebanese film director (b.1959)

- Born: October 24, 1959 (age 66); Beirut, Lebanon
- Education: National Film and Television School
- Occupations: Director, screenwriter, producer, editor

Anthony Waller (born 24 October 1959) is a Lebanese-born British filmmaker.

== Early life ==
Waller was born in Beirut to English parents, and was raised there and in England. He attended Sidcot School in Somerset and the National Film and Television School, graduating in 1981.

== Career ==
Waller began his professional career in West Germany, and became a prolific commercial director, also writing commercial jingles.

He made his feature film debut with the 1995 horror-thriller Mute Witness, shot entirely on-location in Moscow, Russia. The film won Waller the Special Jury Prize at the Festival international du film fantastique de Gérardmer, and was nominated for Best Horror Film at the 22nd Saturn Awards.

In 1997, he directed An American Werewolf in Paris, a sequel to the horror comedy classic An American Werewolf in London (1981). The film received generally negative reviews and was a box-office bomb.

Waller subsequently directed the crime film The Guilty (2000); starring Bill Pullman, the horror film Nine Miles Down (2009); starring Adrian Paul, and the docudrama The Singularity Is Near (2010).

After a 13-year hiatus, Waller returned to directing with the 2023 Russian television series Treyder. The same year, he directed the horror film The Piper.

== Personal life ==
He is signed up for cryopreservation with the Alcor Life Extension Foundation, since 2003.

== Filmography ==
=== Film ===
- Mute Witness (1995)
- An American Werewolf in Paris (1997)
- The Guilty (2000)
- Nine Miles Down (2008)
- The Singularity Is Near (2009)
- The Piper (2023)

=== Television ===
- Treyder (2023)
