= The Medullary Paralysis =

Italian band

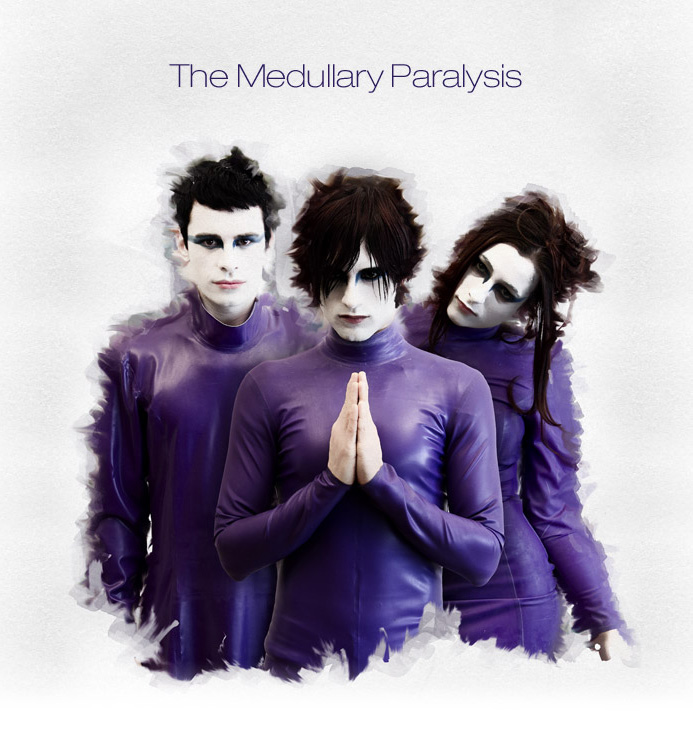
- Left to right: Valentino, Alessandro, Ada.

Background information
- Origin: Padua, Italy
- Genres: Industrial, glam rock, alternative rock
- Years active: 2007–present
- Labels: indie
- Members: Alessandro Alfano; Valentino Coletto; Ada Guagliardi
- Website: www.themedullaryparalysis.com

The Medullary Paralysis (/-mɛˈdʌləri-/) is an Italian alternative glam rock band formed in the province of Padua in early 2007. The band consists of three members: Alessandro Alfano, Valentino Coletto and Ada Guagliardi.

The band describes their style as not-so-industrial glam on the dance floor. The sound of the band can be described as a mix of The Smashing Pumpkins, Marilyn Manson and the 1980s. The band is known to always go around in public dressing latex clothes to encourage people to take the chance to be reborn, to explain that changing their points of view and accepting other routines is possible.

The name of the band refers to the last of 'four stages preceding death' cited on a medical journal the members read.

== History ==
=== Background ===
The members Alessandro and Valentino attended the same kindergarten in San Giorgio in Bosco in the province of Padua. They met again when they began to attend the high school, soon becoming close friends. In early 2007, they started a process of detachment from the social and cultural context in which they lived, which was both natural and spontaneous, saying no to the banality and repetitiveness of those days. In the first half of the same year, they came with the idea of making music to show their message, but it was only in 2010 that Ada entered the band and The Medullary Paralysis was complete.

The members told in interviews their main music influences were their parents' music, the radio and the TV, what they lived as teenagers in the 1990s, bands such as The Smashing Pumpkins and Marilyn Manson, and the music of 1980s.

=== Concept ===
The band has unusual concepts and constantly makes use of topics like addiction, social acceptance, loneliness, victimism, depression as an escape excuse, empathy and controversial ideals in their music to expose their points of view of an alternative vision of the world. The band has the following quote about their concept and main slogan:

The Medullary Paralysis is an idiosyncratic lifestyle. We don't drink, we don't take drugs, we don't have mechanical sex. The problem is addiction. We have a new vision about how to enjoy life. We hate victimism and we practice compassion. Latex is nothing special. You don't need to wear it 24/7 to own your life. Take the chance to be reborn.

=== Alternative visual ===
In different occasions where the band was asked about the eccentric use of Latex to dress them up and the pale make-up, the band overstated that it had no reference to any kind of fetish, but it was only a pretext for talking about a lifestyle that many, looking only at a superficial level, mistake for Puritanism and straight-edge.

=== Name ===
According to an interview the band gave to 'Ritual Magazine', the members read in a medical journal about the four stages preceding death. The name of the band, Medullary Paralysis, is the last stage described by the journal, though it was not chosen to be macabre or dark. The members have told to be fascinated by the idea that it is both the best and the worst moment of our existence, and that what is even more mysterious is that nobody can describe what happens at that moment and nobody can say how it feels.

== International work ==
=== Chinese tours (2010, 2012) ===
uring the summer of 2010, the band travelled to China to make a special tour and introduced Chinese audiences to the Italian trio's not-so-industrial-glam sound.

In June 2012, the band returned to China for a new tour to promote their album You Need Leaders. During that period, they have made an extensive tour through China and Hong Kong.

During their time touring in China, the band was featured in a series called The Hutong Jams (where foreign bands in China incorporated traditional Chinese musical instruments into a music video taking place in a Hutong) and played the Pipa and the Chinese waist drum, adapting their song 'Fashion Slave'.

=== You Need Leaders ===
In 2011, the band went to Ontario, Canada to record their upcoming album named You Need Leaders, in the Charterhouse Studios with André Doucette, studio engineer who participated on This Is War album released by the band Thirty Seconds to Mars. The band has described it as an album about the need for leadership:

The power is in your hands and positivity, willingness and ability to change yourself and what makes you suffer. You can be reborn, you can be a hero in your everyday life.

== Discography ==
=== EP ===
- We Don't Drink, We Don't Take Drugs, We Don't Have Sex, We Feel Compassion (The Medullary Paralysis EP)|We Don't Drink, We Don't Take Drugs, We Don't Have Sex, We Feel Compassion (2009)

=== Album ===
- You Need Leaders (2012)

== Members ==
- Alessandro Alfano – Vocals, Guitars, drums, Synth
- Valentino Coletto – Bass, Guitars, Synth
- Ada Guagliardi – Synth, vocals
