= List of number-one hits of 1996 (Austria) =

This is a list of the Austrian Singles Chart number-one hits of 1996.

Issue date	Song	Artist
7 January	"Gangsta's Paradise"	Coolio featuring L.V.
14 January	"Gangsta's Paradise"	Coolio featuring L.V.
21 January	"Gangsta's Paradise"	Coolio featuring L.V.
28 January	"Gangsta's Paradise"	Coolio featuring L.V.
4 February	"Gangsta's Paradise"	Coolio featuring L.V.
11 February	"Gangsta's Paradise"	Coolio featuring L.V.
18 February	"Spaceman"	Babylon Zoo
25 February	"Spaceman"	Babylon Zoo
3 March	"Spaceman"	Babylon Zoo
10 March	"Spaceman"	Babylon Zoo
17 March	"Lemon Tree"	Fool's Garden
24 March	"Macarena"	Los Del Rio
31 March	"Lemon Tree"	Fool's Garden
7 April	"Macarena"	Los Del Rio
14 April	"Macarena"	Los Del Rio
21 April	"Macarena"	Los Del Rio
28 April	"Children"	Robert Miles
5 May	"Macarena"	Los Del Rio
12 May	"Children"	Robert Miles
19 May	"Children"	Robert Miles
26 May	"Children"	Robert Miles
2 June	"Children"	Robert Miles
9 June	"Children"	Robert Miles
16 June	"Coco Jamboo"	Mr. President
23 June	"Coco Jamboo"	Mr. President
30 June	"Coco Jamboo"	Mr. President
7 July	"Coco Jamboo"	Mr. President
14 July	"Coco Jamboo"	Mr. President
21 July	"Coco Jamboo"	Mr. President
28 July	"Killing Me Softly"	The Fugees
4 August	"Killing Me Softly"	The Fugees
11 August	"Killing Me Softly"	The Fugees
18 August	"Killing Me Softly"	The Fugees
25 August	"Killing Me Softly"	The Fugees
1 September	"Killing Me Softly"	The Fugees
8 September	"Break My Stride"	Unique II
15 September	"Killing Me Softly"	The Fugees
22 September	"Break My Stride"	Unique II
29 September	"Break My Stride"	Unique II
6 October	"Break My Stride"	Unique II
13 October	"Break My Stride"	Unique II
20 October	"Break My Stride"	Unique II
27 October	"Break My Stride"	Unique II
3 November	"How Bizarre"	OMC
10 November	"Zehn kleine Jägermeister"	Die Toten Hosen
17 November	"How Bizarre"	OMC
24 November	"Quit Playing Games (with My Heart)"	Backstreet Boys
1 December	"Quit Playing Games (with My Heart)"	Backstreet Boys
8 December	"Quit Playing Games (with My Heart)"	Backstreet Boys
15 December	"Quit Playing Games (with My Heart)"	Backstreet Boys
22 December	"Quit Playing Games (with My Heart)"	Backstreet Boys
29 December	"Quit Playing Games (with My Heart)"	Backstreet Boys

== See also ==
- 1996 in music
