= Mute Witness =

- Theatrical release poster
- Directed by: Anthony Waller
- Written by: Anthony Waller
- Produced by: Anthony Waller; Alexander Buchman; Norbert Soentgen
- Starring: Marina Zudina; Fay Ripley; Evan Richards; Oleg Yankovsky
- Cinematography: Egon Werdin
- Edited by: Peter R. Adam
- Music by: Wilbert Hirsch
- Distributed by: Sony Pictures Classics
- Release dates: January 28, 1995 (Sundance); September 28, 1995 (Germany); January 19, 1996 (United Kingdom)
- Running time: 95 minutes
- Countries: United Kingdom; Germany; Russia
- Languages: English; Russian
- Box office: $1.1 million

Mute Witness (German: Stumme Zeugin, Russian: Немой свидетель) is a 1995 thriller film written, directed and produced by Anthony Waller, his feature film debut. It stars Marina Zudina, Fay Ripley and Oleg Yankovsky and features a brief cameo appearance by Alec Guinness, his final film role in a theatrically-released film. The plot follows a mute American makeup artist working on a slasher film in Moscow, who is pursued by a crime organization making and dealing snuff films after she stumbles upon one of their film sets and witnesses a murder.

A British-German-Russian co-production, the film premiered at the 1995 Sundance Film Festival. It was released in Germany on September 28, 1995 and in the United Kingdom on January 19, 1996. It received generally positive reviews from critics, and was nominated for Best Horror Film and Best Actress (for Marina Zudina) at the 22nd Saturn Awards. It won the Special Jury Prize at the Festival international du film fantastique de Gérardmer, with Marina Zudina receiving a special mention for her performance.

== Plot ==
Billy Hughes, a special effects make-up artist who is mute, is in Moscow working on a low-budget slasher film directed by Andy Clarke, the boyfriend of her elder sister, Karen. On one particular night, Billy returns to the set to fetch a piece of equipment for the next day's shoot when she is accidentally locked in the studio. Billy phones Karen for help and communicates with her via morse code, but is interrupted when she discovers a small film crew working after-hours to shoot a cheap pornographic film. Watching unseen, Billy is amused until the performed sex becomes sadistic. When Arkadi, the masked actor, pulls out a knife and brutally stabs the actress to death, Billy reacts and is discovered. She flees through the studio, pursued by the film's director, Lyosha, before crashing through a window outside. Moments later, Karen arrives and finds the injured Billy, with Lyosha standing over her. Lyosha pretends to be an innocent bystander who witnessed Billy's accident, but Karen senses he is dangerous based on Billy's body language.

Police arrive and question Lyosha, but come to the conclusion that Billy witnessed an elaborate special effects sequence being shot when they are unable to find a body. Arkadi, the man whom Billy witnessed stab the actress, demonstrates the effects using a fake knife that streams blood, frightening Andy when he pretends to attack him with it. Billy insists the prop knife is hers, and that Arkadi stole it. Billy leads police to an elevator shaft where she believes Lyosha stashed the actress's corpse, but they find it empty. After police dismiss the incident and send Billy home, a night watchman at the studio finds the actress's corpse burning in a basement incinerator before being stabbed to death by Arkadi. Shortly after, a mysterious elderly man arrives at the studio in a vintage car, and asks Lyosha if things "went smoothly." Aware that Billy witnessed the murder, the Reaper makes clear that she must be eliminated.

Meanwhile, a detective, Aleksander Larsen, begins looking into Billy's claim, believing there to be some truth to it, as rumors have circulated about an international crime ring making and selling snuff films in Moscow. The operation is led by a wealthy financier known as "the Reaper." Back at her apartment, Billy communicates with Karen using a digital phone dictation machine. In the midst of her conversation, Billy's doorbell rings, and she is confronted by Arkadi, who breaks in, followed by Lyosha. A violent struggle ensues, during which Billy manages to electrocute Arkadi in the bathtub with a hairdryer. Lyosha subsequently incapacitates Billy, only to be saved by Larsen, who beats Lyosha unconscious.

Larsen quickly escorts Billy away, and explains that the crime ring have targeted her, believing she is in possession of a computer disc containing confidential information. Meanwhile, Karen and Andy arrive at Billy's apartment only to find it disheveled, and they are subsequently attacked by Lyosha, who awakens. Two of the Reaper's thugs posing as policemen arrive at the scene, and they shoot and kill Lyosha before questioning Karen and Andy about the computer disc. Meanwhile, Billy directs Larsen to the film studio, where she believes the computer disc is located.

Karen and Andy meanwhile also rush to the studio, where Andy attempts to shoot at Larsen as he arrives with Billy, believing Larsen means her harm. In the melee, Billy rushes outside only to be confronted by numerous armed thugs, along with the Reaper. Moments later, Larsen shoots Billy multiple times, apparently killing her, before proffering the Reaper the sought-after computer disc. The Reaper and his thugs promptly depart, after which Karen begins to violently beat Larsen for killing her sister. However, Karen quickly realizes that Billy is still alive as she opens her eyes and brandishes remote controlled squib blood packs under her clothes; Larsen orchestrated the fake murder to divert the Reaper and spare Billy's life. The only thing Larsen does not understand is why the Reaper didn't take the diskette from him.

Larsen makes plans to meet Billy the following day, and brings with him one of the studio's corrupt security guards, whom he has bound and gagged. As they are about to drive away, Billy observes the guard's worried expression, and realizes the car has been fixed with a bomb and the reason the Reaper didn't take the diskette from Larsen was that it was going to be destroyed when the car explodes. With Andy's help, she manages to communicate this, and Larsen escapes the vehicle seconds before it explodes, saving himself.

== Cast ==
- Marina Zudina as Billy Hughes
- Fay Ripley as Karen Hughes
- Oleg Yankovsky as Moscow Police Inspector Aleksander Larsen
- Evan Richards as Andy Clarke
- Igor Volkov as Arkadi
- Sergei Karlenkov as Lyosha
- Nikolai Pastukhov as Janitor
- Valeri Barakhtin as Mitja
- Sascha Buchman as Alex
- Olga Tolstetskaya as Actress
- Denis Karasyov as Fake policeman
- Igor Ilyin as Fake policeman
- Oleg Abramov as Double
- Vladimir Salnikov as Lab assistant
- Konstantin Sitnikov as Angry props manager
- Norbert Soentgen as Peeping Tom
- Alec Guinness as "The Reaper"

== Production ==
The film was shot on-location in Moscow. The original screenplay was set in Chicago, Illinois, but Anthony Waller was convinced to shoot in Russia for its cheaper sets and labor. Filming was delayed multiple times, first by a diphtheria outbreak in Moscow, and then again due to the 1993 Russian constitutional crisis. The production's gear was impounded by customs official, whom they had to pay off. Waller also claimed the production paid off Russian mobsters so filming could proceed smoothly.

Gina Bellman was originally cast to play the lead role, but dropped out at the last minute due to illness. Marina Zudina was brought in on short notice, though Waller had to direct her through an interpreter, as she couldn't speak English and he couldn't speak Russian.

Alec Guinness' cameo appearance was filmed nearly a decade before the rest of the movie. Anthony Waller had a chance encounter with the actor in Hamburg in 1985, when the two were working on a television commercial, and asked him if he was interested in doing a one-scene cameo. Guinness took no payment, doing it out of the "goodness of his heart", as the director recalled. The movie ended up being one of his final screen roles. When Waller needed an additional scene, he used the same footage but reversed it.

== Release ==
=== Box office ===
Mute Witness was released theatrically in the United States on 15 September 1995, and earned $560,048 in its opening weekend in 284 theaters. It had an overall worldwide gross of $1,125,910.

=== Critical response ===
On review aggregator Rotten Tomatoes, Mute Witness holds an approval rating of 85%, based on 26 reviews, and an average rating of 7.1/10. Its consensus reads, "Mute Witness is a slickly crafted horror/thriller with some surprising comic twists."

Roger Ebert praised the film, awarding it three out of four stars and comparing it favorably to Halloween (1978) and Blood Simple (1984).

Variety gave the film a mostly positive review, remarking that while the movie can be "entirely plot-driven, neglecting to develop intriguing characterizations", its "suspense is so chilling, its narrative so disciplined and its style so pleasurable, they jointly triumph over the other deficiencies." The review from the New Yorker was more mixed and they wrote that the director's "technique is impressive; the film falls flat only when he attempts to make the frightening funny. But the plot takes some nice twists and turns, the tension builds a good head of steam, and the tawdriness never lets up."

=== Awards and nominations ===
Institution	Year	Category	Nominee	Result
Festival international du film fantastique de Gérardmer	1996	Special Jury Prize	Anthony Waller	Won
Festival international du film fantastique de Gérardmer	1996	Special Mention	Marina Zudina	Won
Nika Award	1995	Best Producer	Grigory Ryazhsky, Alexander Atanesyan	Won
Saturn Award	1996	Best Horror Film		Nominated
Saturn Award	1996	Best Actress	Marina Zudina	Nominated
Sitges Film Festival	1995	Best Film	Anthony Waller	Nominated

== Home media ==
In 2024, the film was released on Blu-ray by Arrow Films.

The Arrow Video 2024 release included the original footage of Guinness's cameo shoot from 1985, which had not been previously made publicly available, offering viewers a glimpse of the early production context in which the scene was filmed.
