= List of number-one hits of 1998 (Austria) =

This is a list of the Austrian Singles Chart number-one hits of 1998.

Issue date	Song	Artist
4 January	"Something About the Way You Look Tonight" / "Candle in the Wind 1997"	Elton John
11 January	"Something About the Way You Look Tonight" / "Candle in the Wind 1997"	Elton John
18 January	"Something About the Way You Look Tonight" / "Candle in the Wind 1997"	Elton John
25 January	"Something About the Way You Look Tonight" / "Candle in the Wind 1997"	Elton John
1 February	"Breathe"	Midge Ure
8 February	"Breathe"	Midge Ure
15 February	"My Heart Will Go On"	Céline Dion
22 February	"My Heart Will Go On"	Céline Dion
1 March	"My Heart Will Go On"	Céline Dion
8 March	"My Heart Will Go On"	Céline Dion
15 March	"My Heart Will Go On"	Céline Dion
22 March	"Alane"	Wes
29 March	"Alane"	Wes
5 April	"Alane"	Wes
12 April	"Alane"	Wes
19 April	"Alane"	Wes
26 April	"Alane"	Wes
3 May	"Alane"	Wes
10 May	"Alane"	Wes
17 May	"Ein Schwein namens Männer"	Die Ärzte
24 May	"No tengo dinero"	Los Umbrellos
31 May	"No tengo dinero"	Los Umbrellos
7 June	"No tengo dinero"	Los Umbrellos
14 June	"No tengo dinero"	Los Umbrellos
21 June	"No tengo dinero"	Los Umbrellos
28 June	"No tengo dinero"	Los Umbrellos
5 July	"No tengo dinero"	Los Umbrellos
12 July	"No tengo dinero"	Los Umbrellos
19 July	"No tengo dinero"	Los Umbrellos
26 July	"No tengo dinero"	Los Umbrellos
2 August	"Ghetto Supastar (That Is What You Are)"	Pras Michel featuring ODB and introducing Mýa
9 August	"Life"	Des'ree
16 August	"Ghetto Supastar (That Is What You Are)"	Pras Michel featuring ODB and introducing Mya
23 August	"Life"	Des'ree
30 August	"Life"	Des'ree
6 September	"Ghetto Supastar (That Is What You Are)"	Pras Michel featuring ODB and introducing Mya
13 September	"I Don't Want to Miss a Thing"	Aerosmith
20 September	"I Don't Want to Miss a Thing"	Aerosmith
27 September	"I Don't Want to Miss a Thing"	Aerosmith
4 October	"I Don't Want to Miss a Thing"	Aerosmith
11 October	"I Don't Want to Miss a Thing"	Aerosmith
18 October	"I Don't Want to Miss a Thing"	Aerosmith
25 October	"I Don't Want to Miss a Thing"	Aerosmith
1 November	"Flugzeuge im Bauch"	Oli.P
8 November	"Flugzeuge im Bauch"	Oli.P
15 November	"Flugzeuge im Bauch"	Oli.P
22 November	"Flugzeuge im Bauch"	Oli.P
29 November	"Flugzeuge im Bauch"	Oli.P
6 December	"Flugzeuge im Bauch"	Oli.P
13 December	"Big Big World"	Emilia
20 December	"Big Big World"	Emilia
27 December	"Big Big World"	Emilia

== See also ==
- 1998 in music
