= Mouldy Old Dough =

Instrumental single by Lieutenant Pigeon

Single by Lieutenant Pigeon

from the album Mouldy Old Music
- B-side: "The Villain"
- Released: February 1972
- Recorded: Winter 1971
- Genre: Pub rock
- Length: 2:45
- Label: Decca
- Songwriters: Nigel Fletcher; Robert Woodward
- Producer: Stavely Makepeace

Lieutenant Pigeon singles chronology
"Mouldy Old Dough" (1972)	"Desperate Dan" (1972)

"Mouldy Old Dough" is a primarily instrumental song by Lieutenant Pigeon. It reached the number one spot in 1972 on charts in Belgium, the UK, Ireland and New Zealand.

== History ==
Written by Nigel Fletcher and Rob Woodward and first produced by them under the name of their other band, Stavely Makepeace, it was recorded in the front room of Woodward's semi-detached house in Coventry, and featured his mother Hilda Woodward on piano, in a boogie-woogie, honky-tonk, ragtime style. The only lyrics, 'sung' by Fletcher, are the growled title "Mouldy Old Dough" and "Dirty Old Man". When asked by Fletcher what those words meant, their author, Woodward, said he had no idea.

It is the only British number one single to feature a mother and son.

Originally released in early 1972, it flopped initially. But picked up in Belgium and used on a current affairs programme, it became a hit there, reaching number one in the Belgian singles chart. Decca Records, encouraged by this success, re-released it in the UK, and with the backing of then BBC Radio 1 DJ Noel Edmonds, it became a hit there, and spent four weeks at the top of the UK Singles Chart in October 1972, selling 790,000 copies. In New Zealand, the song was number one for five weeks. The song also reached number one in Ireland and reached the Top 10 in Canada and Australia, but did not chart in the United States.

"Mouldy Old Dough" (the title being an adaptation of the 1920s jazz phrase, "vo-de-o-do") became the second biggest selling UK single of the year, behind The Band of the Royal Scots Dragoon Guards' bagpipe version of "Amazing Grace".

In April 2019, Hilda Woodward's piano was an exhibit at Coventry Music Museum, where other artefacts belonging to the band were also on display.

== Chart history ==
=== Weekly charts ===
Chart (1972–73)	Peak position
Australia (Kent Music Report)	5
Bangkok (Billboard (magazine))	20
Belgium (Ultratop 50 Flanders)	1
Belgium (Ultratop 50 Wallonia)	3
Canada RPM Adult Contemporary	11
Canada RPM Top Singles	8
Denmark (Hitlisten)	9
France (IFOP)	64
Germany (GfK)	9
Ireland (IRMA)	1
Israel (IBA)	2
Netherlands (Dutch Top 40)	4
Netherlands (Single Top 100)	4
New Zealand (Listener)	1
Norway (VG-lista)	9
Singapore (Rediffusion)	10
South Africa (Springbok Radio)	2
Sweden (Kvällstoppen)	4
Switzerland (Schweizer Hitparade)	2
UK Singles (Official Charts)	1

=== Year-end charts ===
Chart (1972)	Rank
South Africa	15
UK	2

Chart (1973)	Rank
Australia (KMR)	33

== In popular culture ==
It was one of the choices of Jarvis Cocker when he appeared on the long-running BBC Radio 4 programme Desert Island Discs.

In a 1990 interview, Norman Quentin Cook (later known as Fatboy Slim) revealed it was the first record he ever bought.

Various cover recordings appear in multiple V/Vm albums, such as the 1999 album AuralOffalWaffleTenPintsOfBitterAndABagOfPorkScratchings.

Since 1972, the track has played over the PA system at the beginning of Oldham Athletic A.F.C. home games, which coincided with the club rising from the fourth Division to the second Division.

The song was covered by British group Shades of Green, and featured on their first album Rockin' Poppin' Ravin', released in 1973 by Windmill Records, London (WMD 164 stereo).

The song is widely regarded as the 'theme song' for the sport of Banger racing, where it is played at the start of races during the 'rolling lap'.

It also regained attention in New Zealand in the early 1990s after its use in a television advertisement for Instant Kiwi scratchcards.

It was also featured in a PlayStation 2 advertisement where a robot was shown dancing to the song.

== See also ==
- Winifred Atwell – had repeated number one hits with a similar boogie-woogie style of piano-playing.
- Russ Conway
