= A Cry in the Night (song) =

Single by Lory "Bonnie" Bianco

from the album True Love
- Released: June 8, 1989
- Recorded: 1989
- Genre: Pop
- Length: 3:20
- Label: WEA
- Songwriters: Dieter Bohlen; Eric Styx
- Producers: Dieter Bohlen; Luis Rodríguez

"A Cry in the Night" is a single by Lory "Bonnie" Bianco. It was released in 1989, and was a successful hit in Europe including topping the Austrian Singles Chart and peaking at #41 in Germany.

== Track listing ==
- European 7-inch single
1. "A Cry in the Night" – 3:20
2. "A Cry in the Night" (instrumental) – 3:45
- European 12-inch and CD single
1. "A Cry in the Night" – 4:45
2. "A Cry in the Night" (instrumental) – 3:45
3. "One Day Lover" – 4:22

== Chart performance ==
Chart (1989)	Peak position
Austria (Ö3 Austria Top 40)	1
Germany (GfK)	41
