= Lieutenant Pigeon =

British novelty music group

- Origin: Coventry, England
- Genres: Pop, novelty
- Years active: 1972–present
- Labels: Decca, London
- Past members: Robert Woodward; Hilda Woodward; Steven Johnson; Nigel Fletcher
- Website: lieutenantpigeon.co.uk

Lieutenant Pigeon are an English novelty musical group popular in the early 1970s, originating in Coventry.

== Career ==
A spin-off from an experimental music band Stavely Makepeace, the group was fronted by Rob Woodward and managed by him and drummer Nigel Fletcher. Other members included bassist Steven Johnson. The group's sound was dominated by a heavy honky-tonk-style piano played by Woodward's mother, Hilda.

Lieutenant Pigeon achieved two UK hits: "Mouldy Old Dough", written by Woodward with bandmate Fletcher, which reached number one in 1972, followed by "Desperate Dan" (number 17 in 1973). Both tracks were largely instrumental, with the titles providing virtually the only lyrics. "Mouldy Old Dough" (the title being an adaptation of the 1920s jazz phrase, "vo-de-o-do") became the second biggest selling UK single of the year, behind The Band of the Royal Scots Dragoon Guards' bagpipe version of "Amazing Grace".

Lieutenant Pigeon scored a further hit, in the autumn of 1974, when they reached number three in the Australian chart with a cover version of "I'll Take You Home Again, Kathleen". The band stopped gigging in 1978, although Johnson (after recording as Class 50) re-formed the band in the 1980s, touring to notable success in Scandinavia. The line-up went through a number of changes. By the late 1980s Steven Johnson was the only original member of the live band, replaced by Chris Allen (current Troggs lead vocalist) in 1993. Fletcher joined Tasty (which also featured Johnson) and Oakie. Johnson subsequently set up a documentary video production company. Hilda Woodward died, aged 85, on 22 February 1999. She was aged 58 at the time of "Mouldy Old Dough" topping the chart, which made her one of the oldest female artists to feature on a UK number one single.

The Pigeon name, and that of Stavely Makepeace, remain active with former members working together in the production of backing beds and jingles, maintaining a website and releasing occasional new material. Their 2001 release "Opus 400" is a 35-minute single composed of separate sections. For a number of years now, Woodward and Fletcher have continued to produce music which they have made available through their website. Their website includes a newsletter written by Bill Boswell. The newsletter is posted quarterly and features what the band is currently working on and future projects.

== Stavely Makepeace ==
Lieutenant Pigeon were a spin-off from Stavely Makepeace. Primarily consisting of Woodward and Fletcher, they began their career in 1969, experimenting with musical ideas in their home studio. The music they created was a form of eccentric pop that reflected their obsession with producer Joe Meek. Their debut single "(I Wanna Love You Like a) Mad Dog" was released in 1969. A compilation of their material, The Scrap Iron Rhythm Revue, was released in 2004. Their 1972 single "Slippery Rock 70s" was used in the film Hot Fuzz in 2007 after the film's producers heard it on the album.

== Members ==
- Robert "Rob" Woodward – piano, guitar, tin whistle, vocals
- Hilda Woodward – piano
- Steven "Steve" Johnson – bass guitar, tin whistle, vocals
- Nigel Fletcher – drums, vocals

== Discography ==
=== Singles ===
- "Mouldy Old Dough" (1972) – number 1 UK, number 5 AUS
- "Desperate Dan" (1972) – number 17 UK
- "And the Fun Goes On" (1973)
- "Oxford Bags" (1973)
- "I'll Take You Home Again, Kathleen" (1974) – number 3 AUS
- "You Are My Heart's Delight" (1974)
- "The Blue Danube" (1975)
- "Rockabilly Hot Pot" (1975)
- "Goodbye" (from The White Horse Inn) (1976)
- "Grandfather Clock" (1976)
- "Spangles" (1977)
- "Disco Bells" (1978)
- "Bye Bye Blackbird" (1978)
- "Bobbing Up and Down Like This" (1981)
- "Opus 400" (2001)
- "Salute to the Stars" (2025)

=== Albums ===
- Mouldy Old Music (1973 – Decca SKL 5154)
- Pigeon Pie (1973 – Decca SKL 5174)
- Pigeon Party (1974 – Decca SKL 5196)
- Westerns: Diesel Hydraulics on the Western Region in 1974 (1974 - Argo / Decca ZTR 141. Recorded by Nigel Fletcher and Rob Woodward for Stavely Makepeace)

==== Compilation albums ====
- I'll Take You Home Again Kathleen (1974 – Axis 6127)
- The World of Lieutenant Pigeon (1975 – Decca SPA 414)
- Mouldy Old Dough (1998), Emporio
- The Best of Lieutenant Pigeon (2001), Cherry Red
- The Very Best of Lieutenant Pigeon (2017), Not Now Music
- The Decca Years (2023), 7T's

== See also ==
- List of artists who reached number one on the UK Singles Chart
- List of artists under the Decca Records label
- Number 1 Singles in Ireland 1972
