= Lory Bianco =

American singer

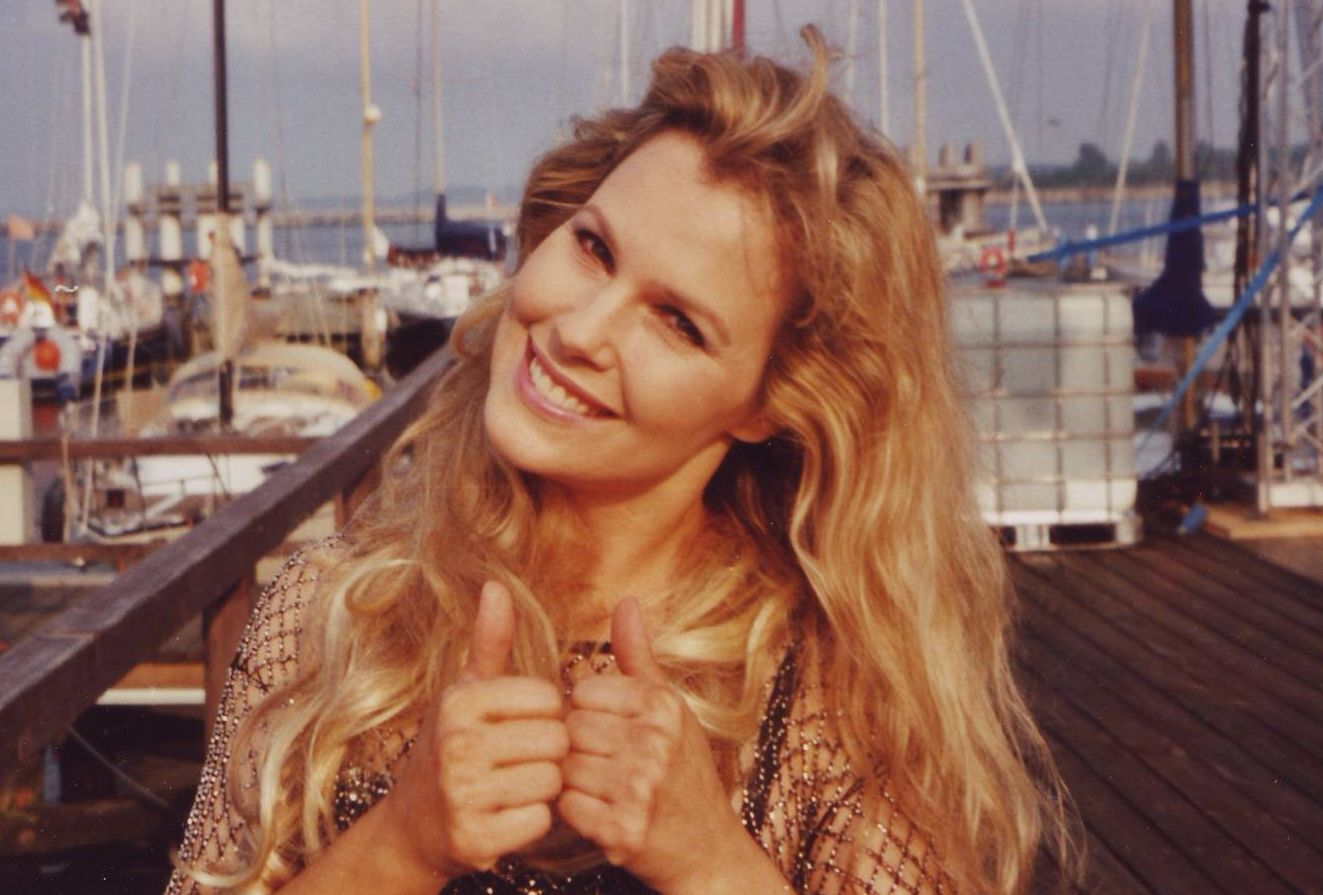
- Bianco in Warnemünde, 2001
- Born: August 19, 1963 (age 63); Pittsburgh, Pennsylvania, U.S.
- Other name: Bonnie Bianco

Lory Bianco (born August 19, 1963) is an American singer and actress also working under the name Lory Lynn "Bonnie" Bianco. She is known for her role in the 1983 miniseries Cinderella 80.

== Artistic life ==
Bianco began her career at the age of 10, performing in musicals, fairs, convalescent homes, hospitals, conventions, and beauty pageants. She was managed by Sam Gino and her mother, Helen Bianco.

Bianco sang both solo and duet with her sister, Holly. Together, the two of them recorded their first single, "Give me a Minute" in 1975. At the age of 16, Bianco received her first professional break with Hal White and Mark Gibbons, who released her single "Teenager in Love" under RCA records. At 18, Bianco was discovered during a talent search by Italian producers Guido and Maurizio De Angelis. The De Angelis brothers signed her to their record label, Kangaroo Records/Polygram, and gave her the stage name Bonnie Bianco.

From 1984 to 1985, Bianco sang and danced in the prime time Saturday Italian variety show Al Paradise.

In 1983, Bianco landed the female leading role of Cindy in the Italian film Cinderella '80, a modernized adaptation of the fairy tale Cinderella. Bianco starred along with French actor Pierre Cosso, known from his movie La Boum 2 with Sophie Marceau. Bianco also recorded the soundtrack for Cinderella 80. The film gave her further success as an actress in Italy.

In 1987, two additional hours of film footage were added to the previously two-hour film and released as a TV series named Cinderella ´87. The duet "Stay" with Pierre Cosso went straight to No. 1 on the German charts and stayed there for several weeks, while the album was in the number 2 spot for several weeks. The single became a Top 3 hit in Switzerland and Austria too.

In 1986, after several months of rest in Israel, Bianco decided not to renew her exclusive contract with the De Angelis Brothers' record label and instead signed with Christian De Walden and Steve Singer in a 1/3 business partnership. They signed a new record deal for the European market with Metronome Records. The first single of the album "Miss You So" was a Top 10 hit on the German and Austrian charts. It was produced by Gunther Mende (Alexis, Falco) and Candy DeRouge.

Bianco and her producer Christian De Walden had different views for her career so they finally mutually agreed to break away from each other. Bianco ended her contract with Metronome after a battle of seven months and signed a new deal with the German record company WEA (Warner-Elektra-Atlantic, belonging to Warner Bros records). They produced a new album, True Love, Lory, as they mutually agreed to gradually fade away from the name "Bonnie". The record company stated that she had become famous by the name "Bonnie Bianco" and people would not know who Lory Bianco was. The album failed to continue the Top 10 success of the two previous albums and failed to reach the German Top 40. Moreover, neither of the two singles off that album cracked the German charts. German hit producer Dieter Bohlen (formerly of the 80s pop group "Modern Talking") was doing the soundtrack for a TV series and persuaded Bianco to sing one of the songs, "A Cry In The Night", which became a hit single for Lory "Bonnie" Bianco, but could not help the album to climb the charts.

For the second album with WEA, Lonely Is the Night, Bianco wanted to go a little more pop, with a touch of dance. Despite being produced by international top-notch producers, such as Klarmann/Weber and some of America's most successful songwriters Diane Warren and Jeff Lorber, Lonely Is The Night flopped.

Bianco spent more time in Israel to contemplate on her career. Homesick and weary of living out of her suitcase, Bianco left WEA records, walking away from at least $300,000 that were guaranteed to her as an advance if she would make two more CDs.

In 1997, Lory recorded the duet "Send a Sign to My Heart" with Chris Norman. It was released on his CD, Into The Night.

In 2001, she produced and released the album On My Own ... But Never Alone. She distributed it through the internet and CDBaby. She promoted her new album on German television in 2001. A day later after she left Germany, the terrorist attacks of September 11, 2001, happened and that had a devastating personal impact on Bianco. She decided not to record pop songs anymore and only sing Christian music. Bianco currently resides in the Pacific Northwestern United States and completed her latest hymn CD-project, called Jesus Paid It All in 2012.

== Discography ==
=== Albums ===
- 1982: Bonnie Bianco (Italy and Germany 1983)
- 1983: Cenerentola '80 (Italy)
- 1984: Al Paradise EP (Italy - Songs of the TV Show)
- 1985: Un' Americana a Roma (Italy and Germany) / re-released in 1993
- 1985: Molly 'O (Italy)
- 1987: Cinderella ´87
- 1987: Just Me
- 1987: Stay (Compilation)
- 1988: True Love, Lory
- 1988: Too Young (Compilation)
- 1990: Lonely Is the Night / re-released in 1996
- 1993: Miss You So – The Very Best Of
- 1993: Stay – The Very Best Of
- 1993: You're the One (Compilation)
- 2001: On My Own... But Never Alone
- 2003: The Deluxe Edition (Compilation)
- 2007: Best Of – Incl. Spanish Mixes (Double CD including Spanish songs)
- 2012: Jesus Paid It All (Christian music & hymns)
- 2017: My Star (Best of CD)
- 2019: My Star 2.0 (Best of CD)

=== Singles ===
- 1984: EP-Single "Al Paradise"
- 1987: "Stay" (with Pierre Cosso)
- 1987: "My First Love" (Cover-version of a song of Gitte Hænning)
- 1987: "Miss You So"
- 1987: "The Heart Is a Lonely Hunter"
- 1988: "When the Price Is Your Love"
- 1989: "Straight from Your Heart"
- 1989: "A Cry in the Night"
- 1989: "Hold On" (Austria only)
- 1990: "Heartbreaker"
- 1990: "Lonely Is the Night"
- 1992: "Talking Eyes"
- 1993: "Stay" (The 1993 Remix)ng by
- 2002: "I Feel the Rhythm" (promo CD only)

=== Chart positions ===
- 1987: "Stay" Germany: #1 Austria: #3 Switzerland and Italy(1984): #2,
- 1987: "Miss You So" Germany: #9 Austria: #7 Switzerland: #12
- 1987: "My First Love" Germany: #52
- 1989: "A Cry in the Night" Germany: #41 Austria: #1
