= Bonedriven =

Single by Bush

from the album Razorblade Suitcase
- Released: 20 October 1997
- Recorded: 1995–1996
- Genre: Alternative rock
- Length: 4:32 (Album Version); 4:07 (Radio Edit)
- Label: Trauma/Interscope
- Songwriter: Gavin Rossdale
- Producer: Steve Albini

Bush singles chronology
| "Greedy Fly" (1997) | "Bonedriven" (1997) | "Cold Contagious" (1997) |

Alternative cover
- UK CD 2 Cover

"Bonedriven" is a ballad by the British rock band Bush, released in October 1997. It is the third single from the band's second album Razorblade Suitcase (1996). It followed the band's hit singles "Swallowed" and "Greedy Fly." "Bonedriven" and "Cold Contagious" are the only Bush singles from 1994–1999 not to be included on the band's 2005 greatest hits compilation, The Best of '94–'99, apparently excluded in favor of two additional tracks from the band's remix album Deconstructed that were not released as singles.

== Details ==
=== Lyrics and themes ===
Gavin Rossdale commented in 1999 that "Bonedriven" was themed around the band themselves.

The title, "Bonedriven", refers to Guy "Bone" Johnson who was the band's bus driver on their 1995 tour.

=== Music ===
"Bonedriven" features strings arranged by guitarist Nigel Pulsford.

== Music video ==
The video was the last video to be made off the Razorblade Suitcase album. Directed by Mark Lebon from 21 to 24 May 1997 in London, the music video was made because BMW approached the band and wanted to use the song in an ad, and they also offered a BMW Z3 to each of the band members. The video was very low budget as the band had no BMW backing, and director Mark Lebon had to follow the band as they toured in the US for a month to shoot live footage from their shows to use in the video on a handheld mini dv camera.

== Commercial performance ==
While reasonably popular in the U.K. (charting at #49), the song failed to chart at all in the United States. "Bonedriven" is notable as the first single Bush had released that wasn't a massive hit, unlike the highly successful singles from their debut album Sixteen Stone and the first two singles from Razorblade Suitcase. "Bonedriven" began a trend of lower-profile singles from Bush, with the exception of "The Chemicals Between Us," the first single from the album The Science of Things, and "Letting the Cables Sleep," also from that album. It is the first single released by the band that did not chart on the Modern Rock Tracks, (a chart in which Bush is in the top 20 most successful artists), the band would not release another single that didn't chart until 2001 from the band's album Golden State.

== Cover art ==
The single's cover may be based on that of R.E.M.'s Lifes Rich Pageant.

== Track listing ==
- UK CD 1 Single IND95553
  1. "Bonedriven (Radio Edit)" - 4:09
  2. "Synapse (Philip Steir Remix)" - 6:24
  3. "Personal Holloway (Soundclash Republic Mix)" - 6:22
  4. "Straight No Chaser" - 4:00
- UK CD 2 Single INDX95553
  1. "Bonedriven" - 4:34
  2. "Bonedriven (Beat Me Clever Mix)" - 4:17
  3. "Everything Zen (Derek De Large Mix)" - 7:17

== Chart positions ==
| Chart (1997) | Peak position |
|---|---|
| Scotland Singles (Official Charts) | 49 |
| UK Singles (Official Charts) | 49 |
