= Disturbing Behavior =

1998 film by David Nutter

- Theatrical release poster
- Directed by: David Nutter
- Written by: Scott Rosenberg
- Produced by: Armyan Bernstein; Jon Shestack
- Starring: James Marsden; Katie Holmes; Nick Stahl; Bruce Greenwood; William Sadler
- Cinematography: John S. Bartley
- Edited by: Randy Jon Morgan
- Music by: Mark Snow
- Production companies: Metro-Goldwyn-Mayer; Beacon Communications
- Distributed by: MGM Distribution Co. (United States and Canada); Columbia TriStar Film Distributors International (International) (Note: excludes Germany and Austria (Highlight Communications))
- Release dates: July 24, 1998 (United States); March 18, 1999 (Australia)
- Running time: 84 minutes
- Countries: United States; Australia
- Language: English
- Budget: $15 million
- Box office: $17.5 million

Disturbing Behavior is a 1998 teen science fiction psychological horror film starring James Marsden, Katie Holmes, and Nick Stahl. The film was directed by David Nutter, who was a director and producer on The X-Files, and the screenplay was written by Scott Rosenberg. The plot follows a group of high school outcasts who discover their seemingly perfect "Blue Ribbon" classmates are part of an elaborate mind control experiment.

The film, which contains nods to the 1975 film The Stepford Wives, was released in the United States on July 24, 1998, and received negative reviews. The film went through numerous studio-mandated cuts from MGM prior to theatrical release in response to negative test screenings. There has been considerable fan support for the release of a director's cut version that restores deleted scenes.

== Plot ==
High school senior Steve Clark is new to Cradle Bay, a picturesque island community in Washington state's Puget Sound. His family has moved from Chicago after the suicide of eldest son Allen, a loss Steve still struggles with. On his first day of school, Steve befriends three outcast students: Gavin Strick, U.V., and Rachel Wagner. He also meets school psychologist Dr. Edgar Caldicott, who suggests he join the Blue Ribbons program, a "motivational workshop".

The Blue Ribbons, a clique of preppy, clean-cut overachievers, attempt to recruit Steve, but Gavin steers him away, claiming they are a murderous cult that has been "brainwashed and lobotomized" by Caldicott. Steve is skeptical of the theory but keeps his distance from the Ribbons.

Outside a grocery store, Rachel is approached by Chug, a Blue Ribbon who is attracted to her. When he catches sight of Rachel in her midriff-baring outfit, he flies into a rage and savagely beats up a man inside the store. Chug nearly kills him while the town's police chief, Officer Cox, simply looks on. When Steve asks what just happened, Rachel deduces it must be "roid rage". Gavin again insists on his mind control theory, producing photos of former burnout friends who were "reprogrammed" into Blue Ribbons.

Gavin takes Steve to a school hideout where they eavesdrop on a parents' meeting hosted by Caldicott. After Gavin hears his parents signed him up for the Blue Ribbons, he shows Steve a gun he plans to use on potential brainwashers. Steve calls him paranoid and wrestles the gun away from him. The next day, Gavin shows up to school with a totally transformed look and attitude befitting the Blue Ribbons.

Steve tries to reach Gavin, but other Blue Ribbons impede. He is beaten up by the clique, with Gavin landing the final blow. At home, he finds Blue Ribbon member Lorna in his living room, having just tutored his younger sister Lindsay. Lorna attempts to seduce him, but in her arousal, she flies into a violent rage. Repeating the words "wrong, bad", she smashes a wall mirror with her head and attacks Steve with a shard, but he subdues her, and she snaps out of her episode.

One day, Rachel is cornered in the school boiler room by Chug, when a device that is used to repel rats by emitting a soft, high-pitched whine goes off, sending Chug into a frenzy. Rachel escapes as Chug finds the device and destroys it. The incident is witnessed by Mr. Newberry, a janitor who has befriended Steve.

Steve and Rachel venture to a nearby mental hospital in search of answers. They learn Gavin was right: Caldicott is implanting brain microchips on teenagers with the approval of their parents, who want to reprogram their children from juvenile delinquents into well-behaved model citizens. However, Caldicott could not turn off the teenagers' hormones, resulting in violent fits whenever the subjects' sexual urges act up. Steve and Rachel return home to get Lindsay but are ambushed by Caldicott and Steve's parents, who reveal their intention to sign Steve up for the program.

Steve and Rachel are incapacitated and wake up at the programming place. Before he can be reprogrammed, Steve gets hold of a scalpel and injures a technician, escaping with Rachel. On their way out, they encounter Chug, but Rachel strikes and kills him with a pipe. U.V. and Lindsay arrive in a truck and the group rushes to catch an outgoing ferry but run into a roadblock where Caldicott and the Blue Ribbons are assembled. Newberry drives up in his car and activates the multiple rat-catching devices strapped to his vehicle, scrambling the mind control tech inside the Blue Ribbons' heads and sending them chasing after him.

While U.V., Lindsay, and Rachel head for the ferry, Newberry, gravely wounded by a gunshot from Caldicott, drives his car off a cliff and takes most of the Ribbons down with him. Steve and Caldicott engage in a struggle, ending with the doctor being pushed off a cliff. After defeating Caldicott, Steve rejoins his friends, and the four teenagers leave Cradle Bay to begin a new life.

A class at an unnamed high school is acting rowdily and playing loud music when the principal walks in to introduce a new student teacher. The teacher reveals himself as a still-alive Gavin, still programmed with the Blue Ribbon technology.

== Cast ==
- James Marsden as Steve Clark
- Katie Holmes as Rachel Wagner
- Nick Stahl as Gavin Strick
- Steve Railsback as Officer Cox
- Bruce Greenwood as Dr. Edgar Caldicott
- William Sadler as Dorian Newberry
- Chad Donella as U.V.
- Ethan Embry as Allen Clark
- Katharine Isabelle as Lindsay Clark
- A. J. Buckley as Charles "Chug" Roman
- Crystal Cass as Lorna Longley
- Tygh Runyan as Dickie Atkinson
- Tobias Mehler as Andy Effkin
- Derek Hamilton as Trent Whalen
- Terry David Mulligan as Nathan Clark
- Susan Hogan as Cynthia Clark
- David Paetkau as Tom Cox
- Jay Brazeau as Principal Weathers
- Peter LaCroix as Ernest Strick
- Lynda Boyd as Lucille Strick
- Daniella Evangelista as Daniella
- Julie Patzwald as Betty Caldicott

== Production ==
Disturbing Behavior was an international co-production between the United States and Australia. Scott Rosenberg's script for Disturbing Behavior was acquired by MGM in August 1997, with Beacon Communications signing on to produce. James Marsden was cast in December of that year. On January 19, 1998, Village Roadshow Pictures acquired international distribution rights to the film, later selling it to Columbia TriStar Film Distributors International for the rest of the world except Germany.

Though the film is set in Washington state, principal photography occurred from January 1998 to late March in the Vancouver area.

=== Studio cuts ===
The film underwent numerous studio-mandated recuts and a reshoot of the original ending due to negative test screenings. Many of the cuts were to scenes providing plot and character development. After the first test audience screening, Nutter cut the backstory for Steve's brother Allen as well as a love scene between Steve and Rachel, but when the film again tested below studios' expectations, MGM proceeded to take full control of the film and hired another editor, George Folsey Jr., to make further cuts. Nutter was instructed to shoot a new ending in which the character of Gavin survives, as test audiences had disliked the plot line where Gavin dies. Cuts made to the film were so severe that Nutter considered having his name removed from the credits, but decided not to out of respect for his cast and crew.

Director David Nutter said he envisioned the film as an atmospheric X-Files-style thriller, but the studio wanted a Scream-style teen horror. He commented, "Their attitude was 'Let's just get to the fright beats.' They felt teenagers wouldn't sit through a picture that was more than 90 minutes."

The studio ultimately cut 31 minutes' worth of film from Nutter's 115-minute version, resulting in an 84-minute theatrical cut.

== Release ==
Metro-Goldwyn-Mayer released Disturbing Behavior theatrically in North America on July 24, 1998. It was released in Australia the following year on March 19, 1999.

=== Home media ===
According to an interview with Fangoria, David Nutter was close to getting a director's cut released on DVD, but MGM prevented him from finishing the restoration. In 2000, MGM released Disturbing Behavior on DVD. Included is a director's audio commentary in addition to eleven deleted scenes not seen in the theatrical version, which includes the original ending where Gavin meets a different fate than the one used in the theatrical release. The deleted scenes exist as an extra feature and are not reinserted into the film.

A Blu-ray version which carries over existing extras was released by Shout! Factory on March 22, 2016. This version of the film has subsequently gone out of print. The film was eventually re-released on Blu-ray through the MVD Rewind Collection on October 11, 2022. This version again carries over existing extras from the original DVD release.

== Reception ==
=== Box office ===
The film opened at No. 7 at the North American box office making $7 million USD in its opening weekend. It had a 57% decline in earnings the following week, falling to No. 12.

=== Critical response ===
==== Contemporary ====
On the review aggregator website Rotten Tomatoes, the film holds an approval rating of 35% based on 40 reviews. Audiences polled by CinemaScore gave it a grade C−.

Negative reviews cited the film's derivative feel, with many claiming it appeared to take well-worn tropes from other horror and science-fiction films like The Stepford Wives, A Clockwork Orange, and Village of the Damned. Stephen Holden of The New York Times said the film "could have worked as an eerie fable about teen-age identity and social stratification in the age of Prozac" but descends into "a paint-by-numbers creep show that can't muster enough energy to be the tiniest bit scary." Multiple reviews said the film lacked in scares.

Positive reviews praised parts of the dialogue, particularly the cafeteria scene where the different school cliques are introduced. The performance of Nick Stahl as rebel outsider Gavin was also cited as being one of the film's highlights. Lisa Schwarzbaum of Entertainment Weekly wrote, "But for all its influences, Disturbing Behavior establishes a semi-real, semi-supernatural, part-mocking, part-commiserating genre of its own—a state so precarious that those expecting chillier frights or warmer laughs may be disappointed."

Other reviews noted a lack of coherence in the story and unevenness in tone. Sight & Sound wrote "Ultimately, the same schizophrenic impulse pervades the entire film: it's too pompous to be camp, but too silly to be genuinely engaging."

==== Retrospective ====
A 2019 review for Gizmodo noted the film "really wants to offer a youthful new twist on some classic sci-fi themes [and] had the potential to be something more." Cinapse also stated, "In spite of all the hacking the studio inflicted upon Disturbing Behavior, many of the filmmakers' core themes of high school life in the late '90s manage to shine through. The film does indeed speak to teen conformity, the pressures to fit in amongst peers and to live up to parental expectations."

== Alternate versions ==
The United States cable networks Syfy Universal and Comet have been known to air a somewhat unofficial director's cut of the film, with the deleted scenes reinstated, although the film is still shown with the theatrical ending.

Although a director's cut was never released, there have been online circulation of fan edit versions which use the DVD's deleted scenes including the film's original ending.

== Soundtrack ==
Disturbing Behavior: Music from the Motion Picture Soundtrack

Soundtrack album by various artists
- Released: July 28, 1998
- Genres: Alternative rock, pop rock
- Label: Trauma Records

Singles from Disturbing Behavior: Music from the Motion Picture Soundtrack
- 1. "Got You (Where I Want You)" Released: July 24, 1998

The soundtrack for the film was released July 28, 1998, and features 12 songs from the genres of alternative rock and post-grunge.

Professional ratings
Review scores
Source	Rating
AllMusic	2/5 stars

The music video for the song "Got You (Where I Want You)" by The Flys contains scenes from the film and features Katie Holmes and James Marsden. Not included in the soundtrack is the song "Flagpole Sitta" by Harvey Danger, which can be heard in the film's mental hospital scene and was used in trailers and TV spots for the film. A soundtrack of the film's score composed by Mark Snow was also released.

1. "Every Little Thing Counts" – Janus Stark
2. "Got You (Where I Want You)" – The Flys
3. "Hole in My Soul" – Hutt
4. "Monster Side" – Addict
5. "Hello" – Once Upon a Time
6. "Blown" – F.O.S.
7. "Million Rappers" – Phunk Junkeez
8. "Sometimes" – Driver
9. "Drivertime Radio" – Eva Trout
10. "Ever She Flows" – Treble Charger
11. "Psycho Clogs" – Jack Drag
12. "Hail Mary" – Skold

== See also ==
- The Stepford Wives
- The Stepford Children
- Strange Behavior
