= The People That We Love =

2001 single by Bush

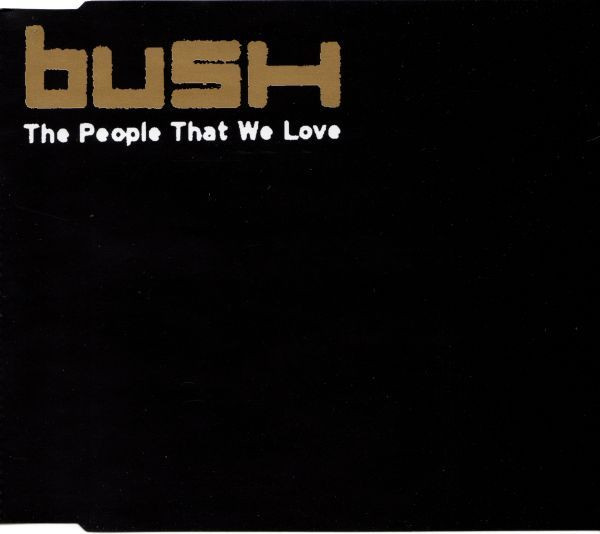

Single by Bush

from the album Golden State
- B-side: "American Eyes"
- Released: 11 September 2001
- Genre: Grunge
- Length: 4:03
- Label: Atlantic
- Songwriter: Gavin Rossdale
- Producer: Dave Sardy

Bush singles chronology
"Letting the Cables Sleep" (2000)	"The People That We Love" (2001)	"Headful of Ghosts" (2002)

Alternate cover
- Early promotional cover of the single, showing the original title, "Speed Kills"

"The People That We Love", originally titled "Speed Kills", is a song by British rock band Bush. It was released on 11 September 2001 as the lead single from the band's fourth studio album, Golden State (2001).

== Title change ==
The song was initially titled "Speed Kills", which can be found on early promotional copies, and it was serviced to rock radio in the United States on the same day as the September 11 attacks. Out of sensitivity for the victims, the title was changed to "The People That We Love"; this title was borrowed from the first line of the chorus.

== Lyrics and style ==
The song's lyrical theme revolves around global acts of violence and the destruction they cause, although it was also rumored to be inspired by the Clinton/Gore US presidential campaign documentary, The War Room. Gavin Rossdale noted that the title has "nothing to do with war and nothing to do with aggression – it was the speed of thought." Rossdale stated in 2023 that the song was initially inspired by Magdalene laundries in Ireland, in which "fallen women" were effectively forced into slavery in religious institutions that operated from the 18th century, only ending fully in 1996.

Stylistically, "The People That We Love" saw a return to form after the experimental sounds of Deconstructed and The Science of Things. Described once as "stop-start grunge heroics", the song also found significant radio play within the early weeks of release but was unable to persevere like early Bush singles.

== Music video ==
The video was directed by Ulf Buddensieck in the summer of 2001 at a London studio. The music video was a big success on television outlets such as MTV2 and MMUSA. Gavin Rossdale expressed his thoughts on the video, stating:

"He (Ulf) came up with a treatment that was exactly what I was looking for.....It was as if I wrote a list and ticked off boxes. He wanted to do something that was edgy and vibrant and alive, and that's exactly what I wanted. Too many videos today are just too dark and moody. They all look like they were shot in a garage. We wanted to be unmoody and undark."

== Track listing ==
- CD single
1. "The People That We Love" – 4:03
2. "American Eyes" – 3:36
3. "The People That We Love" [Golden Dub Mix] – 5:42

== Charts ==
=== Weekly charts ===
Chart (2001)	Peak position
Germany (GfK)	92
Quebec Airplay (ADISQ)	45
Scottish Singles Sales (Official Charts)	88
UK Singles (Official Charts)	81
UK Rock & Metal (Official Charts)	8
US Bubbling Under Hot 100 (Billboard)	14
US Alternative Airplay (Billboard)	11
US Mainstream Rock (Billboard)	10

=== Year-end charts ===
Chart (2001)	Position
US Modern Rock Tracks (Billboard)	53

== Release history ==
Region	Date	Format(s)	Label(s)	Ref.
United States	11 September 2001	Mainstream rock; active rock; alternative radio	Atlantic	
Australia	22 October 2001	CD	Atlantic	
United Kingdom	12 November 2001	CD; cassette	Atlantic	
