= Warm Machine =

2000 single by Bush

Single by Bush

from the album The Science of Things
- Released: 6 March 2000
- Length: 4:25 (album version); 3:46 (radio version)
- Label: Trauma
- Songwriter: Gavin Rossdale
- Producers: Clive Langer; Alan Winstanley; Gavin Rossdale

Bush singles chronology
"The Chemicals Between Us" (1999)	"Warm Machine" (2000)	"Letting the Cables Sleep" (2000)

"Warm Machine" is a song by British rock band Bush. It was released on 6 March 2000 as the second UK and third US single from the band's third album, The Science of Things (1999). There is evidence on SoundCloud that "Warm Machine" was used as a reference track for "All the Right Moves" (2009) and "Do You Feel It?" from the Chaos Chaos EP, Committed to the Crime (2014).

== Commercial performance ==
"Warm Machine" reached No. 38 on the US Billboard Modern Rock Tracks chart and No. 16 on the Billboard Mainstream Rock Tracks chart. In the United Kingdom, the song became the band's third-most successful single, reaching No. 45 on the UK Singles Chart.

== Music video ==
The video was directed by Russel Thomas and Steve Jones on 18 December 1999. The live footage is taken from a show which took place at the Bayfront Amphitheratre in Miami, Florida on 18 December, while the sections of the video with the band playing on a dark stage were filmed in a London studio. The song was actually played twice at the Miami show.

== Track listings ==
- UK CD 1
1. "Warm Machine" (radio version) – 3:48
2. "Swallowed" (live at Molson Centre in Montreal) – 5:06
3. "In a Lonely Place" (Tricky mix) – 7:32
- UK CD 2
1. "Warm Machine"
2. "Warm Machine" (radio version)
3. "Greedy Fly" (live in Montreal)
4. "The Chemicals Between Us" (original demo version)

== Charts ==
=== Weekly charts ===
Chart (2000)	Peak position
Portugal (AFP)	5
Scotland Singles (OCC)	50
UK Singles (OCC)	45
US Alternative Airplay (Billboard)	38
US Mainstream Rock (Billboard)	16

=== Year-end charts ===
Chart (2000)	Position
US Mainstream Rock Tracks (Billboard)	80

== Release history ==
Region	Date	Format(s)	Label(s)	Ref.
United Kingdom	6 March 2000	CD	Trauma	
United States	2 May 2000	Alternative radio	Trauma	
