= Got You (Where I Want You) =

1998 single by The Flys

Single by The Flys

from the album Disturbing Behavior: Music from the Motion Picture Soundtrack and Holiday Man
- B-side: "Damn"; "Holiday Man"; "The Gods of Basketball"; "The Gods of Basketball" (The Colossal Mix)
- Released: July 4, 1998
- Recorded: Cactus Studio (Hollywood)
- Genre: Alternative rock
- Length: 3:59 (album version); 3:40 (single version)
- Label: Trauma; Delicious Vinyl
- Songwriter: The Flys
- Producer: Chris Goss

The Flys singles chronology
"Tyrant" (1996)	"Got You (Where I Want You)" (1998)	"She's So Huge" (1999)

"Got You (Where I Want You)" is a song by American alternative rock band The Flys from the Disturbing Behavior soundtrack and the band's debut album, Holiday Man (1998). It was released as the lead single from both albums on July 4, 1998, by Trauma Records. The song was written by The Flys, while production was helmed by Chris Goss. According to frontman Adam Paskowitz, the song is about desperate attempts to pick up women in bars.

The song reached the top five on the Billboard Modern Rock Tracks chart on December 19, 1998, remaining as The Flys most successful song to date. The song was also featured in the film Sex Drive. A re-recorded version of the song was released in 2008, alongside a cover of The Beatles' "Hey Jude".

== Writing and inspiration ==
Following the release of their debut studio album, 25 Cents (1995), The Flys wanted to explore different genres of music. In an interview with Billboard, front man Adam Paskowitz explained that the band has "played every crap hole that would have us, so we've developed every possible sound ... If you're a touring band, you've got to play it all". The song was written by all members of the band - Adam Paskowitz, Peter Perdichizzi, James Book, Nick Lucero, and Joshua Paskowitz - while Chris Goss produced the effort.

When speaking on the album's themes, Paskowitz said that the majority of the songs on Holiday Man were developed through his own unsuccessful experiences when dating. He further explained the meaning of "Got You (Where I Want You)": "It's about a friend of mine who was in a bar with a gorgeous woman. He was trying everything to strike up a conversation and get her number. You get desperate in the company of women".

== Critical reception ==
Greg Pato of AllMusic referred to the song as "the album's best track," further commenting that it is "dark, Nirvana-esque pop". Michael Roffman of Consequence of Sound referred to the song as a "slice of dreamy alternative," complimenting its appearance on the Disturbing Behavior soundtrack. While ranking 88 of the best alternative rock songs of 1998, Spin placed "Got You (Where I Want You)" at number 28, praising the "rap-reggae breakdown that’s straight out of Pacific Sunwear". In a critical review, Larry Flick of Billboard commented: "[T]he minimalism [of the song's opening] quickly gives way to expected pop-rock, overproduced devices that culminate in metal-band vocalizing that's almost as cheesy as the chorus lyrics: 'Got you (where I want you).'"

== Chart performance ==
In the United States, "Got You (Where I Want You)" debuted at number six on the Billboard Bubbling Under Hot 100 chart for the issue dated December 5, 1998. The song spent a total of 22 weeks on the chart, peaking at number four on the issue dated January 9, 1999. On the Alternative Airplay and Mainstream Rock charts, the song peaked at number five and eight, respectively. The song also reached the top 40 on the Adult Top 40 chart, peaking at number 36. In Canada, "Got You (Where I Want You)" peaked at number 13 on the Canada Top Singles chart for the issue dated December 14, 1998.

== Music video ==
=== Background ===
The music video was directed by Wayne Isham and produced by Dave Robertson. In an interview with MTV, Adam and Joshua Paskowitz explained the conception of the video, describing how they got the leads of Disturbing Behavior (1998), Katie Holmes and James Marsden, to agree to star in the video. Paskowitz said,

We met Katie and James Morrison [sic], and they were doing this teenage, whacked film, and we were like, 'Oh, that's kind of wild. We have this song, and it's called "Got You Where I Want You," see if you like it.' And they did, which was cool. My deal was, if we're going to do your movie, then you come do our video, [although] we didn't really want James Morrison [sic] in our video.

=== Synopsis ===
The video starts with a close-up of Katie Holmes' feet moving around in hay spread over the ground. As the first verse begins, Holmes stands up and runs toward The Flys performing on the top of a cliff. The video then cuts to a scene from Disturbing Behavior featuring Holmes and James Marsden, before briefly cutting to a shot of Holmes standing in a large crowd. As the first chorus begins, Holmes walks past the band as they continue to perform, then pushing two jocks off of a cliff. Once the second verse begins, the video alternates between shots of a group of teenagers running to the top of the cliff and The Flys continuing to perform. As the teenagers reach the top of the cliff where the band is performing, the teenagers all begin to dive off the edge of the cliff into a body of water. As the bridge and final chorus begins, a supercut of more scenes from Disturbing Behavior are shown, with the band themselves then jumping off the edge of the cliff into the water. The band members walking away from the cliff is seen in the last shot.

A version of the video without scenes from Disturbing Behavior also exists; shots of the band performing the song are replaced by clips from the film as described above.

== Track listings and formats ==
- United States CD single and digital download
1. "Got You (Where I Want You)" – 3:52
2. "The Gods of Basketball" – 3:13
3. "The Gods of Basketball" (The Colossal Mix) – 3:50
- European CD single
1. "Got You (Where I Want You)" – 3:40
2. "Damn" – 2:40
3. "The Gods of Basketball" (The Colossal Mix) – 3:50
- Australian CD single
1. "Got You (Where I Want You)" – 3:40
2. "Damn" – 2:40
3. "Holiday Man" – 3:11
4. "The Gods of Basketball" (The Colossal Mix) – 3:50
- Digital download (Re-Recorded)
1. "Got You (Where I Want You)" (Re-Recorded) – 5:17
2. "Hey Jude" – 4:49

== Credits and personnel ==
Credits and personnel are adapted from the Holiday Man album liner notes.

- Adam Paskowitz – writer, lead vocals
- Peter Perdichizzi – writer, guitar, background vocals
- James Book – writer, bass, background vocals
- Nick Lucero – writer, drums, percussion
- Joshua Paskowitz – writer, lead vocals, rhyme
- Chris Gross – producer
- David Holman – mixing
- Paul Palmer – mixing
- Martin Schmelzle – recording, engineering
- Steve Feldman – additional engineering

== Charts ==
Chart (1998–1999)	Peak position
Canada Top Singles (RPM)	13
US Bubbling Under Hot 100 (Billboard)	4
US Adult Pop Airplay (Billboard)	36
US Alternative Airplay (Billboard)	5
US Mainstream Rock Airplay (Billboard)	8

== Release history ==
Region	Date	Formats(s)	Label(s)	Ref(s).
United States	July 4, 1998	Radio airplay	Trauma; Delicious Vinyl	
United States	August 28, 1998	Rock radio	Trauma; Delicious Vinyl	
