= Injected (album) =

Studio album by Phunk Junkeez
- Released: 1995
- Studio: Kala Studios (Atlanta, Georgia) Indigo Ranch Studios (Malibu, California)
- Length: 40:24
- Label: Trauma; Interscope
- Producer: Angelo Moore; Ross Robinson

Phunk Junkeez chronology
Phunk Junkeez (1992)	Injected (1995)	Fear of a Wack Planet (1998)

Injected is the second album by the American band Phunk Junkeez, released in 1995 on Trauma/Interscope Records. The album was co-produced by Fishbone singer Angelo Moore and Ross Robinson. It featured a cover of the Kiss song "I Love It Loud" which appeared in the film Tommy Boy, and was Phunk Junkeez' most successful single, peaking at No. 38 on Billboard's Modern Rock Tracks chart.

== Reception ==
Professional ratings
Review scores
Source	Rating
AllMusic	2/5 stars
Tucson Weekly	2/4 stars

The Tucson Weekly cautioned that the album may "sound numbingly derivative." The Chicago Sun-Times deemed it "high-energy, low-brain." The Sun-Herald praised the "booming hip hop rhythms and massive, distorted guitar riffs."

The Phoenix New Times, described the Junkeez as a “combination of hard-core hip-hop’s funky samples, frantic scratching, and take-no-prisoners rhyming layered over punk rock’s instrumental assaults.”

== Track listing ==
#	Title	Time
1	B-Boy Hard	3:10
2	I Love It Loud	3:04
3	Me 'N Yer Girl	6:48
4	People	2:35
5	Flippin' My Wig	3:46
6	Snapped	3:02
7	Devil Woman	2:12
8	Smooth Tip	4:26
9	Chuck	3:47
10	Liquid Aggression	1:28
11	The Roach Clip	2:44
12	White Boy Day	3:22
