= Sex, Drugs and Rap N' Roll =

Studio album by Phunk Junkeez
- Released: January 23, 2001
- Label: Trauma Records

Phunk Junkeez chronology
| Junk E.P. (1999) | Sex, Drugs and Rap N' Roll (2001) | Rock It Science (2003) |

Sex, Drugs and Rap N' Roll is the fourth release by the rap rock group Phunk Junkeez, released on January 23, 2001, on Trauma Records.

== Track listing ==
| # | Title | Featuring Artists | Time |
|---|---|---|---|
| 1 | Intro | | |
| 2 | Bounce | Milky | |
| 3 | What's Next? | Sen Dog | |
| 4 | American Pimp | | |
| 5 | Short Term Memory Loss | | |
| 6 | Innovators | | |
| 7 | Strugglin' | Common Sense | |
| 8 | Lockdown | Pokaface | |
| 9 | The Quest | | |
| 10 | Playa Hata | | |
| 11 | Psycho Caller | | |
| 12 | Psycho | | |
| 13 | Can You Rock It | | |
| 14 | The Roach, Pt. 2 | | |
| 15 | Adrenaline | | |
