= The Chemicals Between Us =

1999 single by Bush

Single by Bush

from the album The Science of Things
- B-side: "Homebody"; "Letting the Cables Sleep" (demo)
- Released: 14 September 1999
- Genre: Alternative rock; dance-rock
- Length: 3:38 (album version); 3:10 (UK radio edit); 3:06 (international radio edit)
- Label: Interscope; Trauma
- Songwriter: Gavin Rossdale
- Producer: Gavin Rossdale

Bush singles chronology
"Mouth (The Stingray Mix)" (1997)	"The Chemicals Between Us" (1999)	"Warm Machine" (2000)

"The Chemicals Between Us" is a song by English rock band Bush. It was released on 14 September 1999 as the lead single from the band's third album, The Science of Things (1999). It peaked at number 46 in the United Kingdom and topped the US Billboard Modern Rock Tracks chart, becoming their last song to top the chart until "The Sound of Winter" in 2011.

== Lyrics and style ==
Gavin Rossdale described the song as being "all about the differences and distances between people." He also said the song was about misunderstanding and not being able to communicate. He said, "I was thinking the chemicals between us would be when things aren't going so good and you're in that lonely bed with that person and you're not communicating."

The song is unique among most other singles by the band due to its numerous electronic elements as well as an almost dancey percussion. However, it also bears a prominent hard rock guitar riff throughout.

== Commercial performance ==
"The Chemicals Between Us" spent five non-consecutive weeks at number one on the US Billboard Modern Rock Tracks chart and peaked at number 67 on the Billboard Hot 100 on 4 December 1999. The song would eventually become Bush's last major worldwide hit before their 2002 breakup.

== Music video ==
The song's music video was originally going to be directed by Paul Hunter, but he departed due to scheduling conflicts. Stéphane Sednaoui wound up directing the video, which was filmed in late August 1999 in Los Angeles.

Gavin Rossdale on the video:

"Thinking about it, the most extravagant thing was my last video ('The Chemicals Between Us')- that was fucking extravagant. I think the next video I do I'm just going to get a pile of money and burn it, KLF style. I might as well just cut to the chase."

The music video begins with Bush performing in an alley with a white monolith beside them, then Rossdale comes inside the monolith in a white background surrounded by a Japanese-inspired island. Later, the scene becomes interspersed with Rossdale doing karate blindfolded and Parsons doing martial arts as well. The video ends with the band entering the monolith.

== Track listing ==
UK CD1

1. "The Chemicals Between Us" (Radio Edit) – 3:10
2. "The Chemicals Between Us" (Super Collider Vapour Version) – 10:02
3. "The Chemicals Between Us" (CD-ROM Video) – 3:38

UK CD2

1. "The Chemicals Between Us" – 3:37
2. "Homebody" – 4:22
3. "Letting the Cables Sleep (Original Demo)" – 4:36

Australian CD single

1. "The Chemicals Between Us" – 3:37
2. "Homebody" – 4:22
3. "The Chemicals Between Us" [Super Collider Vapour Version] – 10:02
4. "The Chemicals Between Us" [CD-Rom Video] – 3:37

== Charts ==
=== Weekly charts ===
Chart (1999)	Peak position
Australia (ARIA)	93
Canada Rock/Alternative (RPM)	5
Scottish Singles Sales (Official Charts)	49
UK Singles (Official Charts)	46
UK Rock & Metal (Official Charts)	2
US Billboard Hot 100	67
US Alternative Airplay (Billboard)	1
US Mainstream Rock (Billboard)	3

=== Year-end charts ===
Chart (1999)	Position
Canada Rock/Alternative (RPM)	37
US Mainstream Rock Tracks (Billboard)	41
US Modern Rock Tracks (Billboard)	38

Chart (2000)	Position
US Mainstream Rock Tracks (Billboard)	16
US Modern Rock Tracks (Billboard)	23

== Release history ==
Region	Date	Format(s)	Label(s)	Ref.
United States	14 September 1999	Mainstream rock; active rock; alternative radio	Interscope; Trauma	
United Kingdom	22 November 1999	7-inch vinyl; CD	Interscope; Trauma	
