= Fear of a Wack Planet =

Studio album by Phunk Junkeez
- Released: 1998
- Label: Trauma
- Producer: Lee Popa

Phunk Junkeez chronology
Injected (1995)	Fear of a Wack Planet (1998)	Junk E.P. (1999)

Fear of a Wack Planet is an album by the American band Phunk Junkeez, released in 1998. The album's title references the 1990 Public Enemy album Fear of a Black Planet. It was the band's third album.

== Critical reception ==
Professional ratings
Review scores
Source	Rating
AllMusic	2.5/5 stars

Phoenix New Times concluded that "there's certainly a demographic for white-boy funk and rap, but Wack Planet does little to evolve the genre, and will surely be filed inconspicuously among the 311 and Sublime selections of teenagers with pierced lips everywhere." The Washington Post wrote: "Ranging from the loungey 'Down Town' to the raucous 'Million Rappers', the Junkees provide a credible hip-hopped update of the funk-punk sound trailblazed 15 years ago by the Red Hot Chili Peppers." The San Diego Union-Tribune noted: "Weaving pointed social commentary with the seductive rhythms of funk and hip-hop, the Arizona-based group has plenty to say."

== Track listing ==
#	Title	Time
1	Million Rappers	2:35
2	Phunky Phunky (I Am a Junkie)	3:05
3	Hazee	2:49
4	Party People	2:57
5	Downtown	2:55
6	Is Something Wrong	2:55
7	Once Again	4:11
8	Problems	2:31
9	My Reality	2:27
10	Bonez	3:10
11	Paranoid	3:02
12	World Wide Shakedown	2:13
13	In the Dirt	2:25
14	Deadbeat	1:09
15	Is Something Wrong	3:37
