= Inflatable (disambiguation) =

An inflatable is an object that can be inflated with a gas.

Inflatable may also refer to:

- Inflatable (Better Call Saul), an episode of the American television drama Better Call Saul'
- "Inflatable" (song), by alternative rock band Bush
