= Eva Trout =

Eva Trout may refer to:

- Eva Trout (novel), a novel by Elizabeth Bowen
- Eva Trout (band), an Australian alternative rock band
