= Holiday Man =

Studio album by the Flys
- Released: August 25, 1998
- Studios: Cactus Studio (Hollywood); Monkey Studios (Palm Springs)
- Genres: Alternative rock, funk rock, psychedelic rock
- Length: 39:48
- Label: Trauma
- Producer: Chris Goss

The Flys chronology
25 Cents (1995)	Holiday Man (1998)	Outta My Way (2000)

Singles from Holiday Man
- 1. "Got You (Where I Want You)" Released: July 4, 1998; 2. "She's So Huge" Released: February 12, 1999

Professional ratings
Review scores
Source	Rating
AllMusic	4.5/5 stars

Holiday Man is the second studio album by American rock band the Flys. It was released on August 25, 1998, through Trauma Records. The album spawned two singles, "Got You (Where I Want You)" and "She's So Huge", both of which charted on Billboard's Modern Rock Tracks chart.

== Critical reception ==
The Washington Post deemed the album "a little bit hip-hop and a whole lot rock-and-roll ... This is a band that could use a new attitude as much as fresh style." The Record thought that "the Flys would be wingless if it weren't for guitarist Peter Perdischizzi's inventive riffing and knack for strong melodies."

AllMusic wrote that the album "succeeds on inspired performances and their willingness to experiment with the standard alt-rock songwriting formula."

== Track listing ==
All tracks are written by the Flys.

No.	Title	Length
1.	"She's So Huge"	2:38
2.	"Got You (Where I Want You)"	3:49
3.	"Take U There"	3:00
4.	"Afraid"	4:04
5.	"Holiday Man"	3:11
6.	"Groove Is Where You Find It"	3:41
7.	"The Gods of Basketball"	3:13
8.	"Girls Are the Cruelest"	3:28
9.	"Give You My Car"	2:32
10.	"The Family"	3:45
11.	"Superfly"	2:32
12.	"Sexual Sandwich"	3:55

== Personnel ==
- Adam Paskowitz – vocals
- Joshua Paskowitz – vocals
- Peter Perdichizzi – guitar
- James Book – bass
- Nicky Lucero – drums

== Charts ==
Chart (1999)	Peak position
US Billboard 200	109
US Top Heatseekers (Billboard)	1
