= She's So Huge =

Single by The Flys

from the album Holiday Man
- Released: February 12, 1999
- Studio: Cactus Studio (Hollywood)
- Genre: Alternative rock
- Length: 2:38
- Label: Trauma
- Songwriter: The Flys
- Producer: Chris Goss

The Flys singles chronology
"Got You (Where I Want You)" (1998)	"She's So Huge" (1999)	"Losin' It" (2000)

"She's So Huge" is a song by American alternative rock band The Flys from their second studio album Holiday Man (1998). It was released as the second single from the album in 1999, by Trauma Records. The song reached a peak of No. 32 on the Billboard Modern Rock Tracks chart on April 17, 1999.

== Release ==
The song was included on the soundtrack to the film Sugar & Spice (2001).

== Critical reception ==
Billboard compared the song to The Romantics and The Smithereens, commenting that the song relies on “structure, pop instinct, and lyrical pith.”

== Chart performance ==
In the United States, the song debuted at number 36 on the Billboard Modern Rock Tracks chart for the issue dated April 3, 1999. It spent a total of five weeks on the chart, peaking at number 32 for the issue dated April 17, 1999.

== Credits and personnel ==
Credits and personnel are adapted from the Holiday Man album liner notes.

- Adam Paskowitz – writer, lead vocals
- Peter Perdichizzi – writer, guitar, background vocals
- James Book – writer, bass, background vocals
- Nick Lucero – writer, drums, percussion
- Joshua Paskowitz – writer, lead vocals, rhyme
- Chris Gross – producer
- David Holman – mixing
- Paul Palmer - mixing
- Martin Schmelzle - recording, engineering
- Steve Feldman - additional engineering

== Charts ==
Chart (1999)	Peak position
US Alternative Airplay (Billboard)	32

== Release history ==
Region	Date	Formats(s)	Label(s)	Ref(s).
United States	February 12, 1999	Alternative radio	Trauma	
