= Greedy Fly =

Single by Bush

from the album Razorblade Suitcase
- B-side: "Old"
- Released: 26 May 1997
- Genre: Grunge; hard rock
- Length: 4:29 (album version); 3:50 (radio edit)
- Label: Trauma; Interscope
- Songwriter: Gavin Rossdale
- Producer: Steve Albini

Bush singles chronology
"Swallowed" (1996)	"Greedy Fly" (1997)	"Bonedriven" (1997)

Alternative covers
- UK CD 1 cover

"Greedy Fly" is a song by alternative rock band Bush, released on 26 May 1997 as the second single from their second studio album, Razorblade Suitcase (1996).

== Music ==
"Greedy Fly" was described by Caroline Sullivan of The Guardian to show the band to "have a streak of goth a mile wide".

== Music video ==
Bush were one of the early pioneers of the enhanced CD single, with the full video being available as a file on CD 2. The video was directed by Marcus Nispel in December 1996 in Los Angeles. The video was shot in the same building Se7en was shot in and cost nearly half a million pounds (around £961,0000 in 2024).

The narrative unfolds as police investigate a grotesque, subterranean crime scene involving the murder and dissection of a supernatural creature—an angelic figure with mechanic, insect-like anatomy. Frontman Gavin Rossdale portrays the culprit, who is captured and interrogated by law enforcement while confined to a restrictive medical cone resembling a wounded animal. Blending psychological suspense with Cronenbergian body horror, the video ends with Rossdale's character fully succumbing to his delusions and transforming into a humanoid fly.

== Commercial performance ==
"Greedy Fly" was released as the second single from the album, after "Swallowed". The song became a hit, possibly due to its well-known music video, which clocks in at over 7 minutes (although the song itself is only 4:29 long). The song reached the top 5 on both the US Alternative Songs chart and Mainstream Rock Tracks. The song is also the band's second biggest hit in their native Britain where it peaked at No. 22 (behind "Swallowed" which peaked at No. 7).

== Allusions ==
In 2023, American musician Corey Taylor, best known as the lead vocalist of alternative metal band Slipknot, named "Greedy Fly" the Bush song he wished he'd written.

== Track listing ==
All songs written by Gavin Rossdale unless stated.

- UK CD 1 Single IND95536 (Cardsleeve)
  1. "Greedy Fly [Radio Edit]" - 3:50
  2. "Old" - 2:51
  3. "Insect Kin [Live at the London Forum]" - 4:57
  4. "Personal Holloway [Live]" - 3:28
- UK CD 2 Single INDX95536
  1. "Greedy Fly [Video]" - 7:09
  2. "Greedy Fly [LP Version]" - 4:27
  3. "Greedy Fly [Demo]" - 4:25
- AUS CD Single IND95536 (Slidecase)
  1. "Greedy Fly" - 4:28
  2. "Swallowed [Toasted Both Sides Please - Goldie Remix]" - 5:49
  3. "Cold Contagious [16"oz Demo Version]" - 5:57
  4. "Greedy Fly [Video]" - 7:09

== Appearances in the media ==
- Featured on Cold Case in the episode "Spiders".

== Chart performance ==
Chart (1997)	Peak position
Australia (ARIA)	78
Canada Top Singles (RPM)	29
Canada Rock/Alternative (RPM)	6
Europe (Eurochart Hot 100)	88
Scottish Singles Sales (Official Charts)	21
UK Singles (Official Charts)	22
UK Rock & Metal (Official Charts)	3
US Radio Songs (Billboard)	41
US Alternative Airplay (Billboard)	3
US Mainstream Rock (Billboard)	5
