= The Greatest (Phunk Junkeez album) =

Compilation album by Phunk Junkeez
- Released: June 1, 2010
- Recorded: 1996
- Length: 59:17
- Label: Dmaft Records

Phunk Junkeez chronology
The 96' Lost Tapes (2007)	The Greatest (2010)

The Greatest is an online greatest hits compilation album by the rap rock band Phunk Junkeez, released on June 1, 2010, on Dmaft Records.

== Track listing ==
#	Title	Featuring Artists	Time
1	Magnetic Mic Control (Live)		4:00
2	Same Old Song		2:21
3	Join In (Live)		4:01
4	People Following Me (Live		3:38
5	New Orleans		4:18
6	Bounce		3:40
7	B Boy Hard (Live)		2:53
8	The Rhythm, The Rebel (*)	Daddy X	3:20
9	Everyday		3:34
10	Me And Your Girl Are Booty Shakin' (*)		4:23
11	We In Stereo (Rock Remix)	The Dirtball	3:23
12	What's Next?	Sen Dog	3:17
13	Trust Issue (Live)		3:34
14	In The Summertime (Jiggolo Remix)		3:44
15	Handel My Bizness	Daddy X	3:25
16	Million Rappers (Preacherman remix)		3:51
17	Gangsta Rock (Live)		3:16
18	I Am A Junkee (Live)		6:22

- All songs with (*) are featured on the bonus track version of the album.
