= Mouth (Bush song) =

Single by Bush

from the album Deconstructed
- Released: October 1997
- Recorded: 1996, Sarm Hook End, Berks, England and Abbey Road Studios, London, England (original version); Platinum Island Studios, New York City and Bush 8-Track, London England (remixed version)
- Genre: Grunge
- Length: 5:46 (original version); 4:32 (remixed/single version); 5:59 (Deconstructed version)
- Label: Trauma/Interscope
- Songwriter: Gavin Rossdale
- Producers: Steve Albini (original version); Stingray (remixed version)

Bush singles chronology
"Cold Contagious" (1997)	"Mouth" (1997)	"The Chemicals Between Us" (1999)

"Mouth" is a song by British band Bush from their 1996 second album Razorblade Suitcase. Though its original version was not released as a single, it was remixed by Bush under the pseudonym "The Stingray" for the 1997 remix album Deconstructed and was released as a single in October 1997, due largely in part to it being featured prominently in both the trailer and the 1997 film An American Werewolf in Paris. The Stingray remix was the version that made the song popular and received airplay on radio, peaking number 5 on the Billboard Modern Rock Tracks chart.

== Details ==
Patricia Jones of Cryptic Rock opined the original mix of the track to be "one-two punch of classic grunge grit and narcotic rhythms", evoking a "comfortable daze".

== Track listing ==
EU CD-single :

1. "Mouth" (The Stingray Remix Edit)
2. "Mouth" (The Stingray Remix)
3. "Everything Zen" (Republic Remix)
4. "Personal Holloway" (Republic Remix)
5. "Personal Holloway" (Enhanced video)

12" vinyl :

1. "Mouth" (The Stingray Remix)
2. "Synapse" (Philip Steir/ My Ghost in the Bush of Life Mix)
3. "Everything Zen" (Greg Brimson/ The Lhasa Fever Mix)
4. "Insect Kin" (Jack Dangers/ Drum and Bees Mix)

== Music video ==
Directed by John Hillcoat, who also directed the music video for the song "Personal Holloway", the music video for the Stingray Mix served as a tie-in for An American Werewolf in Paris that featured an appearance from Julie Delpy. It mainly shows the band performing at a carnival in the desert while clips from the film intervene.

== Chart positions ==
Chart (1997–98)	Peak position
Canada Rock/Alternative (RPM)	6
US Radio Songs (Billboard)	63
US Alternative Airplay (Billboard)	5
US Mainstream Rock (Billboard)	28
