= Rock It Science =

Studio album by Phunk Junkeez
- Released: 2003
- Label: Suburban Noize Records

Phunk Junkeez chronology
Sex, Drugs and Rap N' Roll (2001)	Rock It Science (2003)	Hydro Phonic (2007)

Rock It Science is the fifth release by the rap rock group Phunk Junkeez, released in 2003. It is their only album to be released on Suburban Noize Records.

== Composition ==
The Phoenix New Times said that the album "mixes a little reggae, a little adult pop and a little trip-hop with a whole lot of punk riffage and old-school monosyllabic rapping."

== Track listing ==
#	Title	Featured artist(s)	Time
1	Magnetic Mic Control		
2	Same Ole' Song		
3	Everyday		
4	Rock It Science		
5	People Following Me		
6	Move It		
7	No Way!		
8	Handle My Bizness	Daddy X	
9	Can't Get By		
10	Heavy on My Mind		
11	On the Run		
12	Gangsta Rock		
13	No Parking on the Dancefloor		
14	Fall in Line		
