= Cold Contagious =

Single by Bush

from the album Razorblade Suitcase
- Released: December 1997 (Australia)
- Genre: Post-grunge
- Length: 6:00 (Album version); 3:55 (Radio edit)
- Label: Trauma/Interscope
- Songwriter: Gavin Rossdale
- Producer: Steve Albini

Bush singles chronology
"Bonedriven" (1997)	"Cold Contagious" (1997)	"Mouth (The Stingray Mix)" (1998)

"Cold Contagious" is the fourth and final single from the band Bush's second studio album, Razorblade Suitcase (1996). Along with "Bonedriven", "Cold Contagious" is the only Bush single from 1994-1999 not to be included on the band's 2005 greatest hits compilation, The Best of '94–'99.

== Style and lyrics ==
"Cold Contagious" features a sharp distorted sound, wailing guitar solo and a heavy, dark drumbeat. The lyrics seem to be about a relationship breaking up, accompanied by a desire for revenge. "Cold Contagious" is unusually long among Bush songs—at about six minutes, it is the longest track Bush ever released, except for the song "Distant Voices," also on Razorblade Suitcase, and "Alien" on Sixteen Stone, which is the same length musically but has about thirty seconds of silence at the end. "Distant Voices" contains two hidden tracks. The radio edit of "Cold Contagious" is much shorter.

Steve Morse of Tampa Bay Times opined "Cold Contagious" displays a "Neil Young influence".

== Music video ==
Directed by Mark Lebon in March and April 1997, the video was shot in West Palm Beach, Florida at the Days Inn Hotel (Hotel room used was 211), East Rutherford, New Jersey and in Madison Square Garden in New York. Dave Parsons' girlfriend is also in the video.

== Chart performance ==
While Razorblade Suitcase initially reached the top spot on the U.S. Billboard 200, its sound proved not to be as radio-friendly as that of Bush's debut album, Sixteen Stone. "Cold Contagious" was not a big hit, peaking at No. 18 on the Mainstream Rock Tracks chart and No. 23 on the Modern Rock Tracks chart, although it was more successful than the third single from the album, "Bonedriven", which failed to chart at all in the U.S.

The single reached No. 4 on Canada's alternative rock chart.

== Track listing ==
- AUS CD Single IND95548 (Digipak)
  1. "Cold Contagious (Radio Edit)" - 3:55
  2. "Swallowed (Goldie Remix)" - 5:50
  3. "Synapse (My Ghost in the Bush of Life Remix)" - 6:29
  4. "In a Lonely Place" - 6:00

== Charts ==
Chart (1997)	Peak position
Australia (ARIA)	75
Canada Top Singles (RPM)	57
Canada Rock/Alternative (RPM)	4
US Alternative Airplay (Billboard)	23
US Mainstream Rock (Billboard)	18
