= Junk E.P. =

EP by Phunk Junkeez
- Released: January 1, 1999
- Label: Uncle Scam Records

Phunk Junkeez chronology
Fear of a Wack Planet (1998)	Junk E.P. (1999)	Sex, Drugs and Rap N' Roll (2001)

Junk E.P. is an EP released by the rap rock group Phunk Junkeez. The EP was released on January 1, 1999, on Uncle Scam Records.

== Track listing ==
#	Title	Time
1	Bounce	4:00
2	The Quest	3:57
3	I Am a Junkee (Live)	4:10
4	Once Again (Live)	9:31
5	Million Rapper (Preacherman mix)	3:52
