= The Flys (American band) =

American rock band

- Origin: Los Angeles, California, U.S.
- Genres: Alternative rock; grunge; post-grunge
- Years active: 1994–2002; 2008; 2024–present
- Labels: Raid America; Trauma; Cleopatra
- Members: Adam Paskowitz; Joshua Paskowitz
- Past members: Peter Perdichizzi; James Book; Nick Lucero; Holmes Jones; Jordan Lawson; Matt Smith; Rob Jones; George Castells; David Halfbreed

The Flys are an American rock band formed in the Hollywood neighborhood of Los Angeles, California, in 1994. The band was founded by Adam and Josh Paskowitz, sons of Dorian "Doc" Paskowitz, described by The New York Times as the "First Family of Surfing." The band has shared the stage and toured with many other well known acts and rock bands, but have been on indefinite hiatus since 2012 except for a brief revival in 2024.

Their 1998 alternative top five hit "Got You (Where I Want You)", was produced by Chris Goss, and the video featured actors Katie Holmes and James Marsden. "Got You (Where I Want You)" was on their debut album Holiday Man in 1998 and appeared on the soundtrack for the 1998 MGM film Disturbing Behavior, starring Holmes and Marsden. The single reached No. 5 on the Modern Rock Charts and the album reached No. 109 on Billboard.

A second single, "She's So Huge," was featured in the 2001 film Sugar & Spice, and The Crow: Salvation soundtrack, along with "What You Want." "She's So Huge" peaked at No. 32 on Modern Rock Charts. In 2000, The Flys released their third album, Outta My Way. The album contained the single "Losin' It", as well as two samples from two songs by the Beach Boys from their Pet Sounds album, "Here Today" and "Caroline, No".

Around 2007, the band recruited actor/musician Jordan Lawson to play bass, Rob Jones to play drums, and George Castells to play guitar. In 2008, they announced on their MySpace page that they had returned with an iTunes single (a cover of the Beatles' "Hey Jude") along with a remake of their biggest hit, entitled "Got You Where I Want You 2008." The Flys toured many times during the band's lifespan, opening for other well known groups. After their last tour, the band went on hiatus.

In August and September 2024, Adam Paskowitz and Josh Paskowitz revived the Flys in 2024 for performances at the Big Kahuna Concert For A Cause and the Rhythm & Resin Festival in California.

In 2025, Chad Childers of Loudwire included the band in his list of "10 '90s Post-Grunge Bands That Should Have Been Bigger".

== Discography ==
=== Studio albums ===
List of studio albums, with selected chart positions
Title	Details	Peak chart positions
Title	Details	US
25 Cents	Released: July 11, 1995; Label: Raid America; Formats: CD	—
Holiday Man	Released: August 25, 1998; Label: Trauma; Formats: CD, cassette	109
Outta My Way	Released: April 11, 2000; Label: Trauma; Formats: CD	—

=== Guest appearances ===
List of guest appearances, showing year released and album name
Title	Year	Album
"Crazy Train"	1999	Universal Soldier: The Return
"What You Want"	2000	The Crow: Salvation

=== Music videos ===
List of music videos, showing year released and directors
Title	Year	Director(s)
"Rejected Coin"	1995	Nick C
"Tyrant"	1996	
"Got You (Where I Want You)"	1998	Wayne Isham
