= Deconstructed (Bush album) =

Remix album by Bush
- Released: 11 November 1997
- Studios: Platinum Island Studios, New York City and Bush 8-Track, London England
- Genres: Post-grunge; electronica; drum and bass; trip hop
- Length: 65:34
- Label: Trauma/Interscope
- Producer: Various

Bush chronology
| Razorblade Suitcase (1996) | Deconstructed (1997) | The Science of Things (1999) |

Singles from Deconstructed
- 1. "Mouth (The Stingray Mix)" Released: October 1997 (EU)

Deconstructed is a remix album by British band Bush, released on 11 November 1997, through Trauma Records. It did not feature any new material but was a collaborative effort between the band and various producers working in the electronic genre of music to remix some of the band's previously released songs. "Mouth (The Stingray Mix)" was released as a single in 1997 and became a minor hit, due largely in part to it being featured prominently in both the trailer and soundtrack for the 1997 film An American Werewolf in Paris.

Three tracks from this album, "Mouth (The Stingray Mix)", "Everything Zen (The Lhasa Fever Mix)", and "Swallowed (The Goldie/Both Sides Toasted Please Mix)" also appear on Bush's 2005 greatest hits compilation, The Best of '94–'99.

In a 1997 interview with NY Rock, Gavin Rossdale noted the development of Deconstructed:

"It was an interesting idea, to try and mix two completely different genres, maybe influence the whole dance and techno scene with some good old fashioned rock. In a way, they are the old singles, but remixed they’ve got a completely different slant which is certainly interesting."

== Reception ==
Professional ratings
Review scores
| Source | Rating |
|---|---|
| AllMusic | 2.5/5 stars |
| Entertainment Weekly | B |
| Music Week | 4/5 stars |
| NME | 5/10 stars |
| Rolling Stone | 3/5 stars |

While not a studio album, Deconstructed often stands among the band's studio catalog and has been frequently cited regarding Bush's transformation from simple post-grunge to more experimental rock. It was followed two years later by their third studio album, The Science of Things, which continued this incorporation of electronic elements into hard rock. This decision brought upon mixed reviews throughout the music world.

AllMusic's Stephen Thomas Erlewine suggested that Deconstructed reflected Bush's need to diversify in the face of the fading post-grunge style. He also prospected that, while some remixes turned out well, Deconstructed would fail to satisfy either audience; Bush fans would allegedly "hate" several tracks because of the stray from the traditional grunge sound, and dance/electronica fans would find much of it "unimaginative."

Robert Levine of Rolling Stone also showed skepticism in Bush's sudden decision to jump into electronic experimentation after long establishing themselves as a stripped down hard rock act. Nevertheless, he claimed, "they make the move more easily than one might expect." Levine complemented various tracks including the "eerie soundscape" of "Swallowed" and added that "amid that ominous din, Gavin Rossdale's voice comes through only occasionally and faintly. Ironically, it's one of the strongest musical statements he's made yet."

Jae-Ha Kim of Entertainment Weekly stated that "Goldie and Bush's Gavin Rossdale are an unlikely combination. But the trip-hop God is among a handful of artists who remix the band on Deconstructed"; and that while "Synapse" "oozes breathy seduction" and "Personal Holloway" "induces dancing, rather than moshing," Kim criticized "Swallowed" and called it "a clunker".

== Track listing ==
| No. | Title | Length |
|---|---|---|
| 1. | "Everything Zen" (The Lhasa Fever Mix) | 4:17 |
| 2. | "Mouth" (The Stingray Mix) | 5:59 |
| 3. | "Swallowed" (Goldie/Toasted Both Sides Please Mix) | 5:48 |
| 4. | "Synapse" (Philip Steir/My Ghost in the Bush of Life Mix) | 6:29 |
| 5. | "History" (Dub Pistols Mix) | 5:44 |
| 6. | "Personal Holloway" (Fabio Paras/Soundclash Republic Mix) | 6:21 |
| 7. | "Bonedriven" (Mekon/Beat Me Clever Mix) | 5:16 |
| 8. | "Insect Kin" (Jack Dangers/Drum and Bees Mix) | 7:05 |
| 9. | "Comedown" (Lunatic Calm Mix) | 6:37 |
| 10. | "Everything Zen" (Derek DeLarge Mix) | 7:17 |
| 11. | "In a Lonely Place" (Tricky Mix) | 5:57 |
| Total length: | | 65:34 |

- The promotional copy of the album contains 10 songs that would be released on the final version of the album. The song “Bonedriven” (Mekon/Beat Me Clever Mix) is absent from this version, but the promotional album also contains the instrumental version of the song “History” as well as “Synapse”
- On the European Edition of the album, "Mouth" (The Stingray Mix) is longer at 5:59.
- Tracks 1, 9, and 10 are remixes of songs from the album Sixteen Stone. Tracks 2–8 are remixes of songs from the album Razorblade Suitcase. The eleventh track, "In a Lonely Place," was previously released on The Crow: City of Angels soundtrack, with some of the other remixes being available as B-sides on the Bonedriven CD singles.

== Charts ==
| Chart (1997) | Peak Position |
|---|---|
| Canadian Albums (Billboard) | 14 |
| New Zealand Albums (RMNZ) | 27 |
| US Billboard 200 | 36 |

== Certifications ==
| Region | Certification | Certified units/sales |
|---|---|---|
| Canada (Music Canada) | Platinum | 100,000^{^} |
| United States (RIAA) | Gold | 500,000^{^} |
^{^} Shipments figures based on certification alone.
