= Hydro Phonic =

Studio album by Phunk Junkeez
- Released: September 18, 2007
- Label: Dmaft Records

Phunk Junkeez chronology
| Rock It Science (2003) | Hydro Phonic (2007) | The 96' Lost Tapes (2010) |

Hydro Phonic is the sixth release by the rap rock band Phunk Junkeez, released on September 18, 2007, on Dmaft Records.

== Reception ==
The album received a four out of ten rating from Blabbermouth.

== Track listing ==
| No. | Title | Length |
|---|---|---|
| 1. | "Trust Issues" | 3:04 |
| 2. | "Join In" (featuring Danny Boone) | 4:53 |
| 3. | "Well Known Fact" | 4:29 |
| 4. | "In the Summertime" | 3:19 |
| 5. | "People Following Me" | 3:36 |
| 6. | "Turnin' Around" (featuring Dogboy) | 3:21 |
| 7. | "What's the Time" | 3:14 |
| 8. | "We in Stereo" (featuring The Dirtball) | 3:04 |
| 9. | "Come to Party" | 3:33 |
| 10. | "The Good, The Bad, The Phunkee" | 3:14 |
| 11. | "Generations" | 3:11 |
| 12. | "Pimp Shit" | 4:19 |
| Total length: | | 44:17 |
