= Letting the Cables Sleep =

2001 song by Bush

Single by Bush

from the album The Science of Things
- Released: 11 January 2000
- Genre: Soft rock
- Length: 4:36 (album version); 4:33 (single version); 4:30 (edit)
- Label: Trauma
- Songwriter: Gavin Rossdale
- Producers: Clive Langer; Alan Winstanley; Gavin Rossdale

Bush singles chronology
"Warm Machine" (2000)	"Letting the Cables Sleep" (2000)	"The People That We Love" (2001)

"Letting the Cables Sleep" is the second single from British rock band Bush's third studio album, The Science of Things. In an interview, Gavin Rossdale revealed that the song was written for a friend who had contracted HIV. The song peaked at number four on the US Billboard Modern Rock Tracks chart and number 51 on the UK Singles Chart.

== Music video ==
The music video (directed by Joel Schumacher) features Gavin looking for an apartment and finding himself in a room with a woman (played by actress Michele Hicks). She is dressed in black and does not acknowledge him until their hands meet on the wall. After this first touch, they begin to kiss and take off their clothes. This sequence is interlinked with scenes of them wordlessly putting their clothes back on after sex. She seems troubled by either regret or the desire to tell him something, but she leaves without a word. After this, she is sitting on a chair elsewhere while Gavin begins painting the wall with the lyrics about 'silence' and 'talking', seeming upset and frustrated. Afterwards, Gavin catches up with her on a sidewalk, and she uses sign language to say that she can't hear him. She is then pulled away by a concerned friend who uses sign language to ask her why she did not call.

== Track listings ==
- UK CD 1 single
1. "Letting the Cables Sleep (single version)" – 4:33
2. "Letting the Cables Sleep (Nightmares On Wax remix)" – 5:24
3. "Letting the Cables Sleep (original demo)" – 4:36
- UK CD 2 single
1. "Letting the Cables Sleep (single version)" – 4:33
2. "Letting the Cables Sleep (Apocalyptica remix)" – 3:57
3. "Mouth (The Stingray Mix)" – 5:59
- European CD single
1. "Letting the Cables Sleep [Nightmares On Wax remix]" – 5:24
2. "Mouth [The Stingray mix]" – 5:59
3. "Letting the Cables Sleep [single version]" – 4:33
- German single
1. "Letting the Cables Sleep [edit]" – 4:30
2. "Everything Zen" – 4:38
3. "Swallowed" – 4:50
4. "Mouth [The Stingray mix]" – 5:58

== Charts ==
=== Weekly charts ===
Chart (2000)	Peak position
Portugal (AFP)	6
Scotland Singles (OCC)	55
UK Singles (OCC)	51
UK Rock & Metal (OCC)	3
US Bubbling Under Hot 100 (Billboard)	13
US Alternative Airplay (Billboard)	4
US Mainstream Rock (Billboard)	26

=== Year-end charts ===
Chart (2000)	Position
US Modern Rock Tracks (Billboard)	39

== Release history ==
Region	Date	Format(s)	Label(s)	Ref.
United States	11 January 2000	Mainstream rock; active rock radio	Trauma	
United Kingdom	22 May 2000	7-inch vinyl; CD	Trauma	
