= Inflatable (song) =

Single by Bush

from the album Golden State
- Released: 1 July 2002
- Recorded: 2001
- Length: 4:22 (Album Version); 4:05 (Radio Remix)
- Label: Atlantic
- Songwriter: Gavin Rossdale
- Producer: Dave Sardy

Bush singles chronology
| "Headful of Ghosts" (2002) | "Inflatable" (2002) | "Afterlife" (2010) |

"Inflatable" is a song by alternative rock band Bush and the final single from their fourth album Golden State. "Inflatable" could not be included on future compilations such as The Best of '94–'99 due to lack of licensing rights.

The song's chorus has a lyric inspired by a line from the Pixies song "Bone Machine". Bone Machine features the line 'You're so pretty when you're faithful to me', while Gavin Rossdale sings 'So pretty when you're faithful'. It was mutual appreciation of the Pixies that drew founding members Gavin Rossdale and Nigel Pulsford together.

The song bears some resemblance to previous Bush hits "Glycerine" and "Letting the Cables Sleep" in that it is more subdued than the band's other singles. However, it is the only Bush song to feature an acoustic guitar.

The song is the last single featuring the four original members of the band and it would be the last single to be released under the Bush name for almost 9 years until 2010 when "Afterlife" was released.

The song was featured in the TV series 7th Heaven and Smallville.

== Promotion ==
Rossdale and new guitarist Chris Traynor performed the song acoustically on the short-lived show Late World with Zach in 2002.

== Track listing ==
CD single

1. "Inflatable" (Radio remix) - 4:05
2. "Headful of Ghosts" (Live) - 4:37
3. "Hurricane" (Live) - 3:29
