= Phunk Junkeez (album) =

Studio album by Phunk Junkeez
- Released: 1992
- Genre: Rap rock
- Label: Naked Language

Phunk Junkeez chronology
Phunk Junkeez (1992)	Injected (1995)

Phunk Junkeez is the Phunk Junkeez' first album, released in 1992 under their label Naked Language. It was re-released on March 21, 2002, under the Ichiban label.

== Track listing ==
1. "Why" – 2:57
2. "Radio Sucks" – 2:22
3. "I Am a Junkee" – 2:50
4. "Kicking Flaver" – 3:02
5. "Going Down to Buckeye" – 2:46
6. "Uncontrollable Urge" – 3:09
7. "The End" – 4:10
8. "Crazy" – 2:36
9. "Pump It Up Some" – 1:33
10. "Thick Like Mornin' Dick" – 2:46
11. "Hip Hop Rock'n'Roll" – 2:32
12. "Swing-O-Things" – 3:00
13. "Trouble" – 2:24
14. "Dalyla" – 5:38
