= James Marsden =

American actor (born 1973)

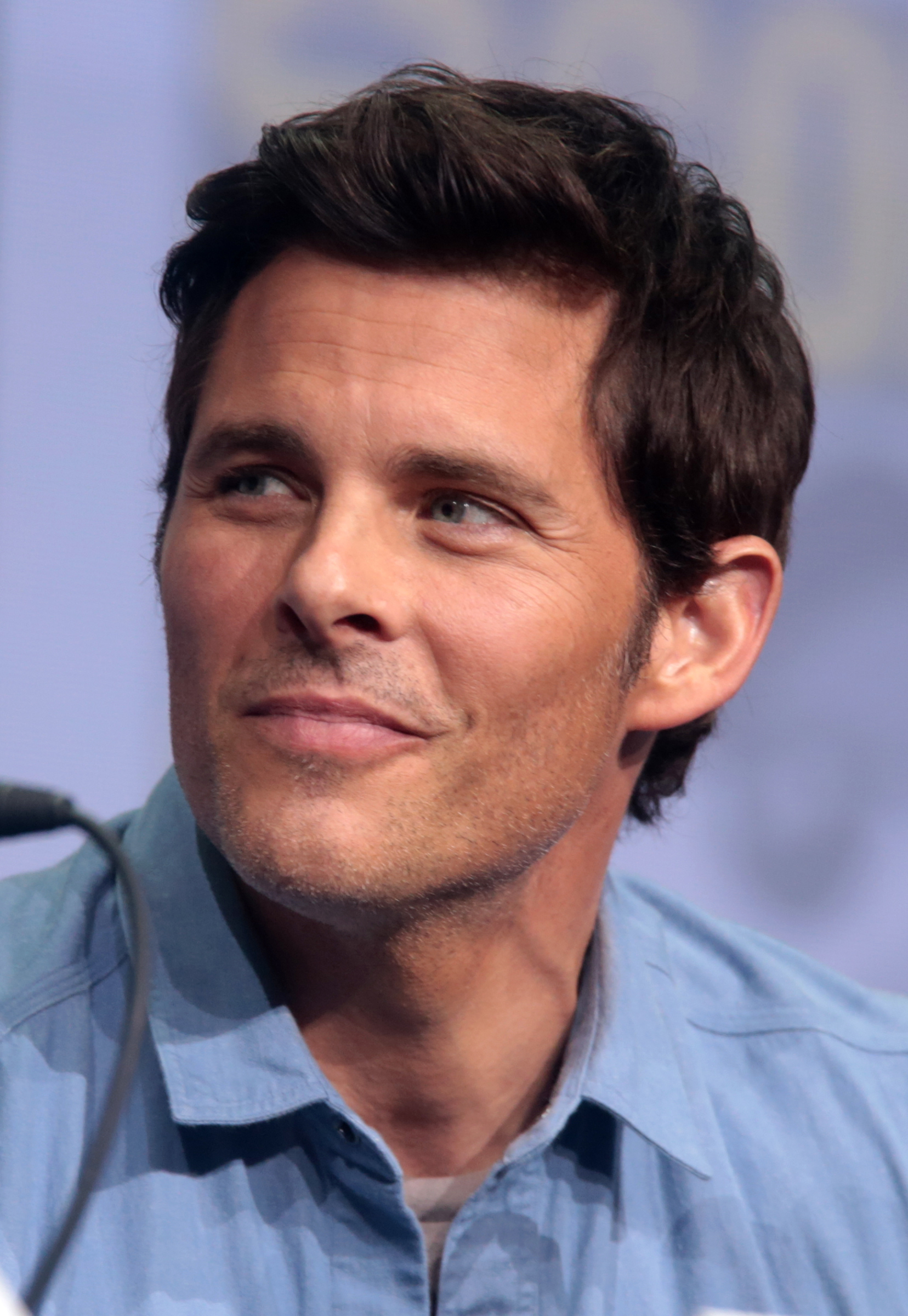
- Marsden at the 2017 San Diego Comic-Con
- Born: James Paul Marsden; September 18, 1973 (age 53); Stillwater, Oklahoma, U.S.
- Occupation: Actor
- Years active: 1993–present
- Spouse: Lisa Linde (m. 2000; div. 2011)
- Children: 3

James Paul Marsden (born September 18, 1973) is an American actor. His accolades include nominations for two Emmy Awards and one Golden Globe. He began his acting career guest starring on the television shows Saved by the Bell: The New Class (1993), Touched by an Angel (1995), and Party of Five (1995). Marsden gained fame for his portrayal of Cyclops in four films of the X-Men film series (2000–2014), and for his roles in the films The Notebook (2004), Superman Returns (2006), Hairspray (2007), Enchanted (2007), 27 Dresses (2008), Hop (2011), and Anchorman 2: The Legend Continues (2013). He portrayed John F. Kennedy in the drama film The Butler (2013), Tom Wachowski in the action-adventure comedy film series Sonic the Hedgehog (2020–present) and is set to reprise his role as Cyclops in the upcoming Marvel Cinematic Universe film Avengers: Doomsday (2026).

Marsden starred in the science fiction series Westworld from 2016 to 2022 and in the black comedy series Dead to Me from 2019 to 2022, for which he received a nomination for a Critics' Choice Television Award. He played guest roles in the sitcoms Modern Family (2011) and 30 Rock (2012–2013). He starred as a fictionalized version of himself in the mockumentary series Jury Duty (2023), for which he received nominations for a Golden Globe Award and a Primetime Emmy Award. Marsden has since starred in the thriller series Paradise (2025), for which he received his second Primetime Emmy Award nomination, and the second season of the black comedy-drama Your Friends & Neighbors (2026).

== Early life and family ==
Marsden was born in Stillwater, Oklahoma, on September 18, 1973, the son of Kathleen (née Scholz) and James Luther Marsden. His father, a food safety advisor to LexiGene Industries, and his mother, a nutritionist, divorced when he was nine years old.

He has four siblings: two younger sisters and two brothers. After attending Hefner Middle School and Putnam City North High School, in Oklahoma City, he attended Oklahoma State University, where he studied broadcast journalism. Marsden left after one and a half years, opting instead to move to Los Angeles to pursue an acting career.

== Career ==
=== Debut and early career (1993–2003) ===
Marsden got his first job in a series of episodes of The Nanny as Eddie, Margaret Sheffield's boyfriend. He then starred in the Canadian television series Boogies Diner, which aired for one season. Following the end of that series, he guest starred on television shows such as Saved by the Bell: The New Class and Party of Five. He later starred in the ABC show Second Noah. He lost out to Edward Norton for a role in Primal Fear and auditioned for the lead role in 54, which then went to Ryan Phillippe. He also starred in the films Disturbing Behavior and Gossip. He appeared in the television series Ally McBeal as one of the main cast members during the first half of season 5, where he also sang. He also starred in a 1998 episode of The Outer Limits.

Marsden was cast as Cyclops in the X-Men films. Marsden also appeared in Bryan Singer's Superman Returns. Singer had dropped out of the third X-Men film to direct Superman and Marsden was cast as Lois Lane's fiancé, Richard White. Due to schedule conflicts, Marsden's screen time in X-Men: The Last Stand was reduced, stirring controversy from fans of the comics. Marsden's portrayal of Cyclops in the films was well received and garnered him a Blockbuster Award for Best Supporting Actor. In 2014 Marsden reprised his role of Cyclops in a brief cameo for X-Men: Days of Future Past.

=== Breakthrough with comedy films (2004–2011) ===
In 2004, Marsden co-starred in the romantic drama The Notebook as Lon Hammond, Jr., the second man Allie Hamilton (McAdams) falls in love with. In 2007, Marsden played Corny Collins in the film adaptation of the Broadway musical Hairspray, based on the 1988 John Waters film of the same name. In the film, he sang two songs, "The Nicest Kids In Town" and "(It's) Hairspray". Both Hairspray and its soundtrack were critically acclaimed. His next role was with Amy Adams in the Disney hybrid animated/live-action film Enchanted, playing Prince Edward. He sang one song as a duet with Adams at the beginning of the film and a duet with Idina Menzel that was cut from the film. Enchanted was well received critically and proved to be a commercial success, earning more than $340 million worldwide at the box office.

Following his successes in 2007's Hairspray and Enchanted, Marsden played the male lead in the 2008 romantic comedy 27 Dresses, which grossed $160 million worldwide. He also starred in the teen comedy Sex Drive. Though the film was a moderate success, Marsden's performance was heavily praised. Marsden also received a Teen Choice Awards nomination for Choice Movie Actor in a Comedy for his roles in Enchanted and 27 Dresses.

In 2009, Marsden also played the male lead in the film The Box, based on the 1970 short story "Button, Button" by author Richard Matheson. In 2010, Marsden was cast in the comedy Death at a Funeral, a remake of the 2007 British film.

Marsden made an appearance on Modern Family in January 2011, playing a squatter. In April, Marsden appeared as the male (live-action) lead in Hop, an Easter-themed comedy. Although the film was considered a commercial success, opening at the top of the weekend box office and grossing over $100 million in the U.S. box office, Hop generally received negative reviews. Later in 2011, Marsden played the lead in Straw Dogs, a remake of Sam Peckinpah's 1971 film; Marsden portrayed the character played by Dustin Hoffman in the original. The film received mixed reviews and ultimately ended up being a box office flop.

=== Independent films and television roles (2012–present) ===
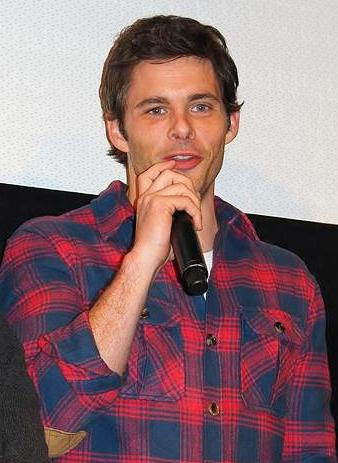
Marsden at the world premiere of Robot & Frank in January 2012

In 2012 and 2013, Marsden appeared in a recurring role in the sixth and seventh seasons of 30 Rock, playing Criss Chros, the boyfriend (and later husband) of the series' main character Liz Lemon. He also appeared in several independent films, including Robot & Frank, Small Apartments, Bachelorette, and As Cool as I Am. In 2013, he co-starred in the action film 2 Guns, which debuted at number one in its weekend release. Soon after, he starred in Lee Daniels' historical drama The Butler as President John F. Kennedy. Marsden played Jack Lime, a rival reporter to Ron Burgundy, in Anchorman 2: The Legend Continues. The following year, he reprised his role as Scott Summers for the first time in eight years in X-Men: Days of Future Past in a cameo. He would also star in his second Nicholas Sparks film titled The Best of Me. Marsden performed as the sentient android Teddy Flood in three seasons of HBO's Westworld.

Marsden appeared as Judy Hale's former boyfriend and lawyer Steve Wood in the Netflix dark comedy series Dead to Me. He later starred in a separate role in the same series as Ben Wood from the second season onward. In 2020, he starred in Paramount's Sonic the Hedgehog film and the Paramount+ television miniseries The Stand. Marsden also starred in the FX miniseries Mrs. America as Phil Crane. In 2021, Marsden provided the voice of Hitch Trailblazer in the Netflix animated film My Little Pony: A New Generation. Marsden reprised his role of Tom Wachowski in the 2022 sequel Sonic the Hedgehog 2. He also reprised the role of Edward in the sequel to Enchanted, titled Disenchanted, which was released on Disney+ in November 2022.

In 2023, Marsden starred as himself in the hoax reality television series Jury Duty, a role which garnered him a nomination for a Golden Globe and a Primetime Emmy award. The series won a 2023 Peabody Award as an Entertainment Honoree.

In 2024, Marsden was announced to return as Tom Wachowski in Sonic the Hedgehog 3. He also starred as Jack LaLanne in Unfrosted, which was released on Netflix in May of that year.

Marsden will return as Cyclops in the Marvel Cinematic Universe film Avengers: Doomsday (2026).

== Personal life ==
Marsden married Mary Elizabeth "Lisa" Linde, daughter of Dennis Linde, on July 22, 2000. The couple has two children: a son born in 2001 and a daughter born in 2005. They divorced in 2011, with Linde citing irreconcilable differences.

He also has a son, born in 2012, with model Rose Costa. He resides in Austin, Texas.

In March 2024, the docuseries Quiet on Set: The Dark Side of Kids TV revealed that Marsden were among the industry figures who had written letters of support requesting leniency for dialogue coach Brian Peck during his 2004 sentencing for the sexual abuse of a minor, since revealed to be actor Drake Bell.

== Filmography ==
Key
| † | Denotes films that have not yet been released |

=== Film ===
| Year | Title | Role | Notes |
|---|---|---|---|
| 1994 | No Dessert, Dad, Till You Mow the Lawn | Tyler Cochran | |
| 1996 | Public Enemies | Doc Barker | Direct-to-video |
| 1997 | Campfire Tales | Eddie | Segment: "The Hook" |
| 1998 | Disturbing Behavior | Steve Clark | |
| 2000 | Gossip | Derrick Webb | |
| 2000 | X-Men | Scott Summers / Cyclops | |
| 2001 | Sugar & Spice | Jack Bartlett | |
| 2001 | Zoolander | John Wilkes Booth | |
| 2002 | Interstate 60: Episodes of the Road | Neal Oliver | |
| 2003 | X2 | Scott Summers / Cyclops | |
| 2004 | The Notebook | Lon Hammond | |
| 2004 | The 24th Day | Dan | |
| 2005 | Heights | Jonathan Kessler | |
| 2006 | The Alibi | Wendell Hatch | |
| 2006 | 10th & Wolf | Tommy Santoro | |
| 2006 | X-Men: The Last Stand | Scott Summers / Cyclops | |
| 2006 | Superman Returns | Richard White | |
| 2007 | Enchanted | Prince Edward | Also voice |
| 2007 | Hairspray | Corny Collins | |
| 2008 | 27 Dresses | Kevin "Malcolm" Doyle | |
| 2008 | Sex Drive | Rex Lafferty | |
| 2009 | The Box | Arthur Lewis | |
| 2010 | Cats & Dogs: The Revenge of Kitty Galore | Diggs | Voice |
| 2010 | Death at a Funeral | Oscar | |
| 2011 | Hop | Fred O'Hare | |
| 2011 | Straw Dogs | David Sumner | |
| 2012 | Bachelorette | Trevor Graham | |
| 2012 | Robot & Frank | Hunter Weld | |
| 2012 | Small Apartments | Bernard Franklin | |
| 2013 | Anchorman 2: The Legend Continues | Jack Lime | |
| 2013 | As Cool as I Am | Chuck Diamond | |
| 2013 | The Butler | John F. Kennedy | |
| 2013 | 2 Guns | Harold Quince | |
| 2013 | The Tale of the Princess Kaguya | Prince Ishitsukuri | English voice dub |
| 2014 | The Best of Me | Dawson Cole | |
| 2014 | The Loft | Chris Vanowen | |
| 2014 | Walk of Shame | Gordon | |
| 2014 | Welcome to Me | Rich Ruskin | |
| 2014 | X-Men: Days of Future Past | Scott Summers / Cyclops | Cameo appearance |
| 2015 | Accidental Love | Scott | |
| 2015 | The D Train | Oliver Lawless | |
| 2015 | Into the Grizzly Maze | Rowan | |
| 2015 | Unfinished Business | Jim Spinch | |
| 2017 | The Female Brain | Adam Simmons | |
| 2017 | Shock and Awe | Warren Strobel | |
| 2018 | Henchmen | Hank | Voice |
| 2019 | Once Upon a Time in Hollywood | Burt Reynolds | Extended cut |
| 2020 | Sonic the Hedgehog | Tom Wachowski | |
| 2021 | The Boss Baby: Family Business | Tim Templeton | Voice |
| 2021 | My Little Pony: A New Generation | Hitch Trailblazer | Voice |
| 2022 | Sonic the Hedgehog 2 | Tom Wachowski | |
| 2022 | Disenchanted | King Edward | Also voice |
| 2023 | Knox Goes Away | Miles Knox | |
| 2023 | Paw Patrol: The Mighty Movie | Hank | Voice |
| 2024 | Unfrosted | Jack LaLanne | |
| 2024 | Sonic the Hedgehog 3 | Tom Wachowski | |
| 2026 | Mike & Nick & Nick & Alice | Quick Draw Mike | |
| 2026 | Avengers: Doomsday † | Scott Summers / Cyclops (Earth-10005) | Post-production |
| 2027 | Sonic the Hedgehog 4 † | Tom Wachowski | Post-production |
| 2027 | An Innocent Girl † | | Filming |

=== Television ===
| Year | Title | Role | Notes |
|---|---|---|---|
| 1993 | In the Line of Duty: Ambush in Waco | Steven Willis | Television film |
| 1993 | Joe's Life | Brian | Episode: "Parental Guidance Not Suggested?" |
| 1993 | The Nanny | Eddie | 2 episodes |
| 1993 | Saved by the Bell: The New Class | Chad Westerfield | Episode: "Homecoming King" |
| 1994 | Boogies Diner | Jason | Episode #2.28 |
| 1994 | Heavenly Road | Jeremy | Television film |
| 1994 | Search and Rescue | Keith | Television film |
| 1995 | Blossom | Josh | Episode: "The Date" |
| 1995 | Party of Five | Griffin Holbrook | Episode: "The Ides of March" |
| 1995 | Touched by an Angel | Jake | Episode: "Angels on the Air" |
| 1996 | Gone in a Heartbeat | Michael Galler | Television film |
| 1996 | 919 Fifth Avenue | Will | Television film |
| 1996–1997 | Second Noah | Ricky Beckett | Main cast |
| 1997 | Bella Mafia | Luka | Television film |
| 1997 | On the Edge of Innocence | Jake Walker | Television film |
| 1998 | The Outer Limits | Brav | Episode: "Rite of Passage" |
| 2001–2002 | Ally McBeal | Glenn Foy | Main cast (season 5) |
| 2009 | Robot Chicken | Jason Chambers / Lion | Voices; episode: "Especially the Animal Keith Crofford" |
| 2011 | Modern Family | Barry | Episode: "Slow Down Your Neighbors" |
| 2012–2013 | 30 Rock | Criss Chros | Recurring role |
| 2014–2016 | Wander Over Yonder | Sir Brad Starlight | Voice; 3 episodes |
| 2016–2022 | Westworld | Teddy Flood | Main cast (seasons 1–2; 4) |
| 2017 | Tour de Pharmacy | Rex Honeycut | Television film |
| 2019–2022 | Dead to Me | Steve Wood / Ben Wood | Main cast |
| 2020 | Mrs. America | Phil Crane | 3 episodes |
| 2020–2021 | The Stand | Stu Redman | Main cast |
| 2022 | Green Eggs and Ham | Bo | Voice; episode: "You Only Mom Twice" |
| 2023 | Party Down | Jack Botty | 2 episodes |
| 2023-present | Jury Duty | Himself | Main cast |
| 2025-2026 | Paradise | Cal Bradford | Main cast (season 1), recurring (season 2) |
| 2025 | No Taste Like Home with Antoni Porowski | Himself | Episode: "James Marsden's German Dish Up" |
| 2026 | Your Friends & Neighbors | Owen Ashe | Main cast (season 2) |

=== Music videos ===
| Year | Title | Artist(s) | Role | Notes | Ref. |
|---|---|---|---|---|---|
| 1998 | "Got You (Where I Want You)" | The Flys | Himself | | |
| 2014 | "I Did with You" (Lyric Video) | Lady A | Dawson Cole | Archival footage | |
| 2020 | "Imagine" | Gal Gadot & friends | Himself | Cameo appearance | |

== Discography ==
| Year | Song | Album |
|---|---|---|
| 2000 | "Glow" | Gossip |
| 2007 | "True Love's Kiss" (with Amy Adams) | Enchanted |
| 2007 | "That's Amore" | Enchanted |
| 2007 | "The Nicest Kids in Town" | Hairspray |
| 2007 | "(It's) Hairspray" | Hairspray |
| 2021 | "If You Want to Sing Out, Sing Out" | The Boss Baby: Family Business |
| 2022 | "The Magic of Andalasia" | Disenchanted |

== Awards and nominations ==
| Award | Year | Category | Work | Result | Ref. |
|---|---|---|---|---|---|
| Astra TV Awards | 2023 | Best Guest Actor in a Comedy Series | Party Down | Nominated | |
| Astra TV Awards | 2023 | Best Supporting Actor in a Streaming Comedy Series | Dead to Me | Nominated | |
| Astra TV Awards | 2023 | Best Supporting Actor in a Streaming Comedy Series | Jury Duty | Won | |
| Blockbuster Entertainment Awards | 2001 | Favorite Supporting Actor – Sci-Fi | X-Men | Won | |
| Critics' Choice Movie Awards | 2008 | Best Acting Ensemble | Hairspray | Won | |
| Critics' Choice Television Awards | 2023 | Best Supporting Actor in a Comedy Series | Dead to Me | Nominated | |
| Critics' Choice Television Awards | 2024 | Best Supporting Actor in a Comedy Series | Jury Duty | Nominated | |
| Golden Globe Awards | 2024 | Best Supporting Actor – Television | Jury Duty | Nominated | |
| Hollywood Film Awards | 2007 | Ensemble of the Year | Hairspray | Won | |
| Independent Spirit Awards | 2024 | Best Ensemble Cast in a New Scripted Series | Jury Duty | Won | |
| MTV Movie & TV Awards | 2001 | Best On-Screen Team (shared with Halle Berry, Hugh Jackman, and Anna Paquin) | X-Men | Nominated | |
| MTV Movie & TV Awards | 2014 | Best Fight (shared with cast) | Anchorman 2: The Legend Continues | Nominated | |
| Primetime Emmy Awards | 2024 | Outstanding Supporting Actor in a Comedy Series | Jury Duty | Nominated | |
| Primetime Emmy Awards | 2025 | Outstanding Supporting Actor in a Drama Series | Paradise | Nominated | |
| Saturn Awards | 2007 | Best Supporting Actor | Superman Returns | Nominated | |
| Screen Actors Guild Awards | 2008 | Outstanding Performance by a Cast in a Motion Picture | Hairspray | Nominated | |
| Screen Actors Guild Awards | 2014 | Outstanding Performance by a Cast in a Motion Picture | The Butler | Nominated | |
| Screen Actors Guild Awards | 2014 | Outstanding Performance by an Ensemble in a Comedy Series | 30 Rock | Nominated | |
| Screen Actors Guild Awards | 2017 | Outstanding Performance by an Ensemble in a Drama Series | Westworld | Nominated | |
| Screen Actors Guild Awards | 2021 | Outstanding Performance by an Ensemble in a Comedy Series | Dead to Me | Nominated | |
| TCA Awards | 2023 | Individual Achievement in Comedy | Jury Duty | Nominated | |
