= Headful of Ghosts =

Promotional single by Bush

from the album Golden State
- Released: November 2001
- Venue: Grunge
- Length: 4:21
- Label: Atlantic
- Songwriter: Gavin Rossdale
- Producer: Dave Sardy

Bush chronology
"The People That We Love" (2001)	"Headful of Ghosts" (2001)	"Inflatable" (2002)

"Headful of Ghosts" is a 2001 song by the British band Bush from their fourth album Golden State. It was released as the second American single in November 2001.

== Music video ==
No music video was made for the single, however a live performance of the song was used as a music video to promote it.

== Chart positions ==
Chart (2001–02)	Peak position
US Alternative Airplay (Billboard)	38
US Mainstream Rock (Billboard)	34
