= Golden State (album) =

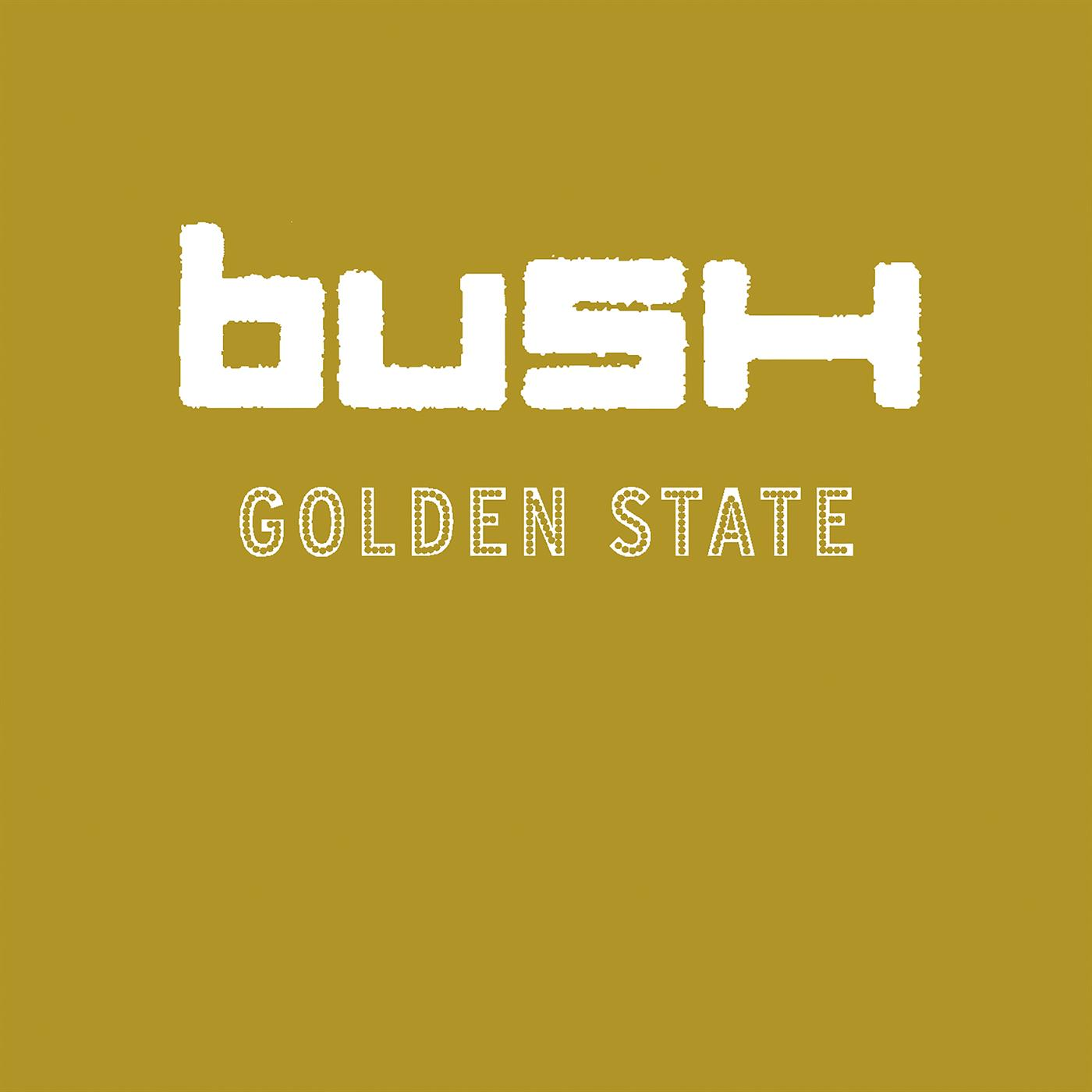

Studio album by Bush
- Released: 23 October 2001
- Studios: Olympic Studios, London; The Village Recorder, West Los Angeles
- Genres: Rock; post-grunge
- Length: 47:21
- Label: Atlantic
- Producers: Dave Sardy; Bush

Bush chronology
| The Science of Things (1999) | Golden State (2001) | The Best of '94–'99 (2005) |

Scrapped album cover
- The original album cover featured a plane, which was removed in response to the 11 September attacks that had happened just over a month prior

Singles from Golden State
- 1. "The People That We Love" Released: 11 September 2001; 2. "Inflatable" Released: 1 July 2002

Golden State is the fourth studio album by the English rock band Bush, released on 23 October 2001 in the United States and on 29 October 2001 in the United Kingdom through Atlantic Records. It is the last Bush album to feature Nigel Pulsford and Dave Parsons on guitar and bass, respectively. Bush would not release another studio album again until ten years later with The Sea of Memories (2011). The liner notes of Golden State state that the album is dedicated to the memory of Ian Lowery, founder of Folk Devils. In the documentary Making of Golden State, the title is revealed as being inspired by the Golden State Freeway, by which road Gavin Rossdale formerly travelled home.

Following the raw, Steve Albini–produced Razorblade Suitcase (1996) and the electro-tinged hard rock of The Science of Things (1999), Golden State was considered by Stephen Thomas Erlewine to be a return to the band's style from 1994, when they released their debut album Sixteen Stone.

== Production ==
When asked by Rolling Stone reporter Christina Saraceno what the band was trying to achieve with Golden State, Rossdale replied:

I think to be honest, a lot of it was thinking about what kind of stuff I wanted to do live. To write new songs, you've got to start knocking some songs off the set list, and so I just kind of thought about songs like that, really. So everything has to be quite strident and forceful because we were playing in a rehearsal room and it was horrible [laughs], so it had to be strong.

Rossdale also mentioned in an NY Rock interview that people would often have the clichéd idea that he is a dark, depressed person. To counteract this, he used the name Golden State because it sounded "warm and positive". Regarding the songs' positive theme, Rossdale noted "I'm far more relaxed and I guess that influenced the album quite a bit." The stripped-down musical style was a result of the band practicing all the songs five weeks before recording. This voided the use of industrial elements as heard on The Science of Things. As a final test, Rossdale played the songs through a "shitty" car stereo to make sure they recorded well.

Nigel Pulsford later expressed disappointment at the final mix of the album:

Golden State suffered from too much Pro Tools and I don't think it sounds very good: all the life was produced out of it. It's a shame because the basic backing tracks sounded great.

== Music ==
The music of Golden State is held to be a resurrection of the sound of the band's 1994 debut album, Sixteen Stone. Rossdale commented that he felt the band were "coming back full-circle" with the record, after a near decade together, further proclaiming Golden State to be "a real rock record" with a sound he felt was "very naked" and "empowering and uplifting".

== Promotion ==
The album's original cover featured an outline of a passenger airliner. Following the September 11, 2001 attacks, the band changed the artwork to something more minimal. The album's lead single, "The People That We Love", was originally titled "Speed Kills" (which appeared on advance promo copies and early radio promos advertising the song), but it was renamed for the same reason, after being listed as an inappropriate song by Clear Channel Communications. Regarding the name change, the band posted this message on their website:

Since the song is one of love, appreciation and rising against adversity, we hope that this change will reflect our desire to be part of the soothing that art brings at these times.

The song "Headful of Ghosts" also featured a lyric change when performed live, substituting the word terrorist for maverick, for the same reason.

Upon release, "The People That We Love" saw significant radio play as well as heavy rotation of its music video on MTV2. However, compared to earlier Bush hits, it has since been virtually forgotten on radio. A follow-up single was not released in the US, making this Bush's final American single for nine years until they reunited in 2010 with the single "Afterlife". In the UK, "Inflatable" was released as a single with an accompanying video.

Golden State was released by Atlantic Records, which originally distributed Sixteen Stone. Bush co-hosted the 22 October 2001 edition of Channel One News to promote the album and give away an autographed copy, an act that critics of the educational program derided.

== Critical reception ==
Professional ratings
Aggregate scores
| Source | Rating |
|---|---|
| Metacritic | 63/100 |
Review scores
| Source | Rating |
| AllMusic | 4/5 stars |
| Alternative Press | 6/10 |
| Entertainment Weekly | B |
| LA Weekly | (unfavorable) |
| Q | 4/5 stars |
| Rock Sound | 3.5/5 stars |
| Rolling Stone | 2.5/5 stars |
| Spin | 6/10 |
| Yahoo! Music UK | 8/10 stars |

Golden State received mostly positive reviews from music critics. At Metacritic, where they assign a "weighted average" rating out of 100 to selected independent ratings and reviews from mainstream critics, the album received a Metascore of a 63, based on 11 reviews, indicating "generally favorable reviews".

Stephen Thomas Erlewine of AllMusic gave a mainly positive review, considering Bush "comfortable and powerful, rocking hard" and to be "turning out songs that are not only catchy, but that hold together and cohere over the course of an album." Erlewine complemented the band's return to their 1994 sound, giving the view that Golden State sounded "charmingly retro".

Kerrang! lauded Golden State as "Bush's best album yet".

Jenny Eliscu of Rolling Stone was, however, more dismissive, commenting: "Today, the group could be criticized for imitating itself... Gavin Rossdale's delicious rasp is still unequivocally sexy, but his melodies are rote versions of the same old song." She added: "Nothing here hits the inevitable, almost scientific heights the band reached with anthems like 'Everything Zen' or 'Glycerine.' As it is, Golden State has only a few bright spots."

== Track listing ==
All songs written by Gavin Rossdale

| No. | Title | Length |
|---|---|---|
| 1. | "Solutions" | 4:27 |
| 2. | "Headful of Ghosts" | 4:21 |
| 3. | "The People That We Love" | 4:01 |
| 4. | "Superman" | 4:00 |
| 5. | "Fugitive" | 4:02 |
| 6. | "Hurricane" | 3:15 |
| 7. | "Inflatable" | 4:18 |
| 8. | "Reasons" | 3:41 |
| 9. | "Land of the Living" | 4:15 |
| 10. | "My Engine Is with You" | 2:35 |
| 11. | "Out of This World" | 4:04 |
| 12. | "Float" | 4:15 |
| Total length: | | 47:21 |

B-sides and unreleased tracks
| No. | Title | Length |
|---|---|---|
| 1. | "Japanese Freight Train" (B-side) (Released on official website; bonus track on Australian and Japanese releases) | 3:41 |
| 2. | "American Eyes" (B-side) ("The People That We Love" single) | 3:37 |
| 3. | "Fireball" (20th Anniversary Expanded) | 3:58 |

== Song appearances in other media ==
"The People That We Love" was included on the Need for Speed: Hot Pursuit 2 soundtrack and was originally to be included in Need For Speed: Carbon. "Solutions" was used in the soundtrack for Swimfan and was played in the background during the party scene. "Inflatable" was used in the first season Smallville episode "Leech". "Out of This World" was featured in the Buffy the Vampire Slayer episode "Dead Things". Bush performed "The People That We Love" on 3 Degrees of Clones (2001)

== Personnel ==
Bush

- Gavin Rossdale – lead vocals, rhythm guitar
- Nigel Pulsford – lead guitar, backing vocals
- Dave Parsons – bass
- Robin Goodridge – drums

Additional musicians

- Paul Eastman – piano
- Jamie Muhoberac – keyboards
- Eric Stefani – piano

Technical personnel

- Bush – production
- Pete Black – photography
- Billy Bowers – editing
- Greg Fidelman – engineer
- Paul Foley – editing
- Lorraine Francis – assistant engineer
- G – art direction
- Bon Harris – programming
- Stephen Marcussen – mastering
- Dennis Morris – photography
- Dave Sardy – mixing, production, sonics
- Stewart Whitmore – mastering

== Chart performance ==
=== Album ===
| Chart (2001) | Peak position |
|---|---|
| Australian Albums Chart (ARIA) | 78 |
| Austrian Albums (Ö3 Austria) | 11 |
| Belgian Albums (Ultratop Flanders) | 31 |
| Dutch Albums (Album Top 100) | 41 |
| European Albums (European Top 100 Albums) | 28 |
| German Albums (Offizielle Top 100) | 10 |
| Scottish Albums (Official Charts) | 59 |
| Swiss Albums (Schweizer Hitparade) | 31 |
| UK Albums (Official Charts) | 53 |
| UK Rock & Metal Albums (Official Charts) | 4 |
| US Billboard 200 | 22 |

=== Singles ===
| Single | Chart | Peak position | Year |
|---|---|---|---|
| "The People That We Love" | Billboard Mainstream Rock Tracks | 10 | 2001 |
| "Inflatable" | | | 2002 |
