= Swallowed (song) =

1996 single by Bush

Single by Bush

from the album Razorblade Suitcase
- B-side: "Broken TV"
- Released: 22 October 1996
- Genre: Alternative rock; hard rock; post-grunge
- Length: 4:51 (album version); 4:08 (UK radio edit); 4:22 (Australian radio edit)
- Label: Trauma; Interscope
- Songwriter: Gavin Rossdale
- Producer: Steve Albini

Bush singles chronology
"Machinehead" (1996)	"Swallowed" (1996)	"Greedy Fly" (1997)

Music video
- "Swallowed" on YouTube

Alternative covers
- UK CD2 cover

"Swallowed" is a song by British rock band Bush, released to US radio in October 1996 as the lead single from the band's second studio album, Razorblade Suitcase (1996). It was released as a single in Japan and Europe and also appeared on both Bush greatest-hits albums, with live versions appearing on Zen X Four (2005) and Live in Tampa (2020), with remixed editions featured on Deconstructed (1997) and Loads of Remixes (2024).

== Composition ==
A power ballad, the song is in A-flat major. Gavin Rossdale opined in 1999 that, despite a musical dissimilarity, the song was "[his] version" of the Beatles' song "Help!".

== Critical reception ==
British magazine Music Week rated the song four out of five, adding that "the successful British exports look set for their first big UK hit with this melodic cut." David Sinclair from The Times described it as "an undeniably catchy tune, once you get past the meaningless lyric and self-conscious Nirvana-isms." It was nominated for Best Hard Rock Performance at the 1998 Grammy Awards, losing to the Smashing Pumpkins' "The End Is the Beginning Is the End".

== Commercial performance ==
"Swallowed" was released as the lead single from the follow-up to their debut album, Sixteen Stone, which was released two years prior. Upon release, the song topped the Billboard Modern Rock Tracks chart for seven consecutive weeks (their longest stay at number one on the chart) and peaked at number 27 on the Billboard Hot 100 Airplay chart. It was also Bush's biggest hit in their native Britain, where it peaked at number seven on the UK Singles Chart.

== Music video ==
The accompanying music video for "Swallowed", directed by Jamie Morgan, was filmed in October 1996 and released later that month, is set in a retro apartment with myriad alternative youths. A neon crucifix (which would later become the album cover for Deconstructed) is frequently interspersed amongst the antics of houseguests. The video was shot at Twickenham Studios England and in Florida. The video was nominated for several MTV Video Music Awards.

American rock band Third Eye Blind opted to work with Jamie Morgan for their "Semi-Charmed Life" music video after seeing his work on "Swallowed".

== Track listings ==
- UK CD single 1
1. "Swallowed" (radio edit) – 4:08
2. "Broken TV" – 4:28
3. "Glycerine" – 4:26
4. "In a Lonely Place" – 5:58
- UK CD single 2
1. "Swallowed" (LP version) – 4:53
2. "Swallowed (Toasted Both Sides Please)" (Goldie remix) – 5:50
3. "Insect Kin" (live on Saturday Night Live) – 4:09
4. "Cold Contagious" (16"oz demo version) – 5:57
- Australian CD single
1. "Swallowed" (radio edit) – 4:22
2. "Broken TV" – 4:28
3. "Communicator" – 4:24
4. "Glycerine" (live at Pinkpop, Holland) – 4:42

== Charts ==
=== Weekly charts ===
Chart (1996–1997)	Peak position
Australia (ARIA)	25
Canada Top Singles (RPM)	5
Canada Rock/Alternative (RPM)	1
Europe (Eurochart Hot 100)	59
Iceland (Íslenski Listinn Topp 40)	21
Ireland (IRMA)	22
Israel (IBA)	15
Netherlands (Single Top 100)	100
Scottish Singles Sales (Official Charts)	7
UK Singles (Official Charts)	7
UK Rock & Metal (Official Charts)	1
UK Airplay (Music Week)	44
US Radio Songs (Billboard)	27
US Alternative Airplay (Billboard)	1
US Mainstream Rock (Billboard)	2
US CHR/Pop Top 50 (Radio & Records)	50
US Pop/Alternative Top 20 (Radio & Records)	4

=== Year-end charts ===
Chart (1996)	Position
Canada Rock/Alternative (RPM)	40
US Mainstream Rock Tracks (Billboard)	94
US Modern Rock Tracks (Billboard)	86

Chart (1997)	Position
Canada Top Singles (RPM)	52
Canada Rock/Alternative (RPM)	42
US Mainstream Rock Tracks (Billboard)	27
US Modern Rock Tracks (Billboard)	35

== Release history ==
Region	Date	Format(s)	Label(s)	Ref.
United States	22 October 1996	Contemporary hit radio	Trauma; Interscope	
Japan	4 December 1996	CD	Interscope	
United Kingdom	17 February 1997	CD; cassette	Interscope; Trauma; MCA	
