= Phunk Junkeez =

American rap rock band

- Also known as: PJ, The PJ Crew, Junkeez
- Origin: Phoenix, Arizona, U.S.
- Genres: Rap rock Rap metal
- Years active: 1990-present
- Labels: Naked Language; Interscope; Uncle Scam Records; Trauma; Suburban Noize; Dmaft; Gold Chain
- Members: Joe Valiente; Kirk Reznik; Jim Woodling
- Past members: Jeff Scott; Jesse Valiente; Daniel Patterson (deceased); Mike Hill; Steve Dukes; Dan Mueller; Jeff O'Rourke; Mike Kramer
- Website: phunkjunkeez.com

The Phunk Junkeez is an American rap rock band from Phoenix, Arizona that formed in 1991. The group's original lineup consisted of vocalists Joe Valiente (Soulman) and Kirk Reznik (K-Tel Disco). Other members rotated through over the years.

The band plays music using a number of different styles, from hardcore punk to trip-hop. They established a strong underground following in the 1990s as one of the first punk rock-based bands to combine elements of funk, hip-hop, and soul, preceding the larger rap rock movement of the decade. The band is notable for being one of the first to include a DJ within a traditional four-piece rock band.

The Phunk Junkeez released six albums, and they contributed to numerous commercials and film soundtracks. They are perhaps best known for their cover version of the Kiss song "I Love It Loud" from the 1995 Tommy Boy soundtrack. The band has toured extensively throughout the U.S. as well as Europe and Japan.

== History ==
=== Formation and early years ===
The Phunk Junkeez founders, Kirk Reznik and Joe Valiente, started performing to prerecorded beats under the name "White Boy Rap". Later, they performed as an opening act for artists such as MC Hammer and Run-D.M.C. They changed their name to "BumRap" in 1987, followed by the "Phunk Junkeez" in 1990.

Reznik and Valiente then merged with a local band called "Freak Squad". Freak Squad band members included Jumbo Jim (bassist), Mike Kramer (guitarist), and Disco Danny Dynamite (a.k.a. Disco Danny D, Disco Dan, DK Mueller) on drums. The group soon added Jeff Scott (a.k.a. DJ Roach Clip). The Phunk Junkeez performed in Phoenix throughout the early 1990s, playing at illegal warehouse raves and clubs.

The band released their self-titled debut album in 1992. This album became locally popular, leading to interest from major record labels. The Phunk Junkeez were signed to Trauma Records/Interscope Records, and they released their second album, Injected (1995), nationwide. This release was primarily recorded in Atlanta and produced by Angelo Moore of Fishbone and Ross Robinson (Korn, Slipknot, At the Drive-In). Injected included the successful single, "I Love it Loud (Injected Mix)". The single received widespread play on alternative stations throughout the country. The release of the single was accompanied by a video featuring Chris Farley and David Spade, and was featured on the Tommy Boy soundtrack. "I Love it Loud (Injected Mix)" eventually reached a peak of 38 on the U.S. Billboard Hot 100. Another track from the album B-Boy Hard was featured on the soundtrack to National Lampoon's Senior Trip.

=== Touring and Reznik's departure ===
The Phunk Junkeez toured extensively during this time, playing with No Doubt, Bush, Faith No More, Ramones, and KMFDM, but mostly with 311. The Phunk Junkeez were referenced in the song "Jackolantern's Weather" from 311's self-titled album released in 1995 as well as 311's "Misdirected Hostility", which was written after 311 witnessed a fight between Reznik and then guitarist Jeff O'Rourke, and then a second brawl on that same tour between Reznik and Disco Danny Dynamite.

While opening for Dada at a September 24, 1993, concert at the Mesa Amphitheater in Mesa, Arizona, Phunk Junkeez were pulled from the stage after playing for several minutes past the city's noise curfew. Despite the requests of producer Brad Laughlin and threats to call the police, the Phunk Junkeez would not allow Laughlin to interrupt the set, forcing the venue to shut off the PA system. The band kept playing with only stage amplifiers, but soon the lights were turned off as well. Once backstage, the band's leader, K-Tel Disco, tossed tables and chairs and threatened the producers of the event, who left without paying the band. By then, a large percentage of the audience had left the venue before seeing Dada perform. The band was banned from playing at Mesa Amphitheater for several years. They were scheduled to play the venue again in 2003, but left before taking the stage after a dispute with the Insane Clown Posse.

In 1994, Reznik was removed from the band. After his departure, the band immediately went on tour, bringing along a mobile recording studio to record their next album. The ideas written while on tour became the basis of Fear of a Wack Planet, which was recorded in Amsterdam, produced by Lee Popa, and released in 1998. The band then began touring more frequently, with acts such as Incubus, Shootyz Groove, The Urge, Insane Clown Posse, 2 Skinnee J's, and Clutch. Jeff O'Rourke quit the band after the bulk of this touring to pursue a film career.

=== Sex, Drugs and Rap N' Roll to Present ===
In 1999, Danny P replaced Jeff O'Rourke on guitar, and the band began writing their next album. Danny P was a member of the local Phoenix band Surf Ballistics. The band has said that Danny P sparked their creativity and was a driving force during their next four releases. With Danny P, the band became popular on the national underground scene. They toured worldwide, with performances in South America, Canada, Japan, Mexico, and China. The band quickly recorded "Junk EP" on their newly formed independent record label, "Uncle Scam Records." The band found themselves on national TV on MTV, MTV2, and USA Network when they put out a music video for the song "Bounce." The song "American Pimp" also became popular nationwide at this time.

With their recent successes, the band decided to record a new album. They built a state-of-the-art studio in downtown Phoenix, Arizona, and hired producer Jeff Poe (Santana, Guns N' Roses). The album was mixed and parts were recorded at Can/Nam studios in California. In January 2001, the band released Sex, Drugs and Rap N' Roll (2001). This marked the start of the band becoming more underground. On this and the next three albums, bassist Jumbo Jim took over as the band's recording engineer. New MC Milky (Valiente's younger brother) also joined the band to rap alongside Roach and Valiente. This release was produced and mixed by Jeff Poe. One of the singles off the album, What's Next, featured a collaboration with Sen Dog of Cypress Hill.

After four albums and 11 years of touring, Drummer "Disko" Dan Mueller left the Phunk Junkeez to pursue other musical endeavors. The Phunk Junkeez added Steve "Dukes" Dueck. During the Sex, Drugs and Rap N' Roll tour, they joined up with Suburban Noize Records while supporting Kottonmouth Kings for most of the spring and summer of 2002. They abandoned their tour to join the Kottonmouth Kings tour, canceling all of their previously scheduled shows without notifying any of the venues. Concertgoers arrived, but were informed that the band had not yet arrived. Only later did frustrated venue managers, who could not get in touch with the band, visit the band's website and learn of the change in the tour.

The band began to tour over 200 days a year in major and secondary markets. The Phunk Junkeez then signed a record deal with Suburban Noize and released their fifth album, Rock It Science, the following year. After tracking drums for this album, Dukes left the band for family reasons and was replaced by Money Mike on drums. This album was produced by Jumbo Jim and Valiente, recorded by Jumbo Jim, and mixed by Ken Mary. The songs, "Same Ole Song" and "Fall in Line," from Rock It Science, appeared on the soundtrack to Harold & Kumar Go to White Castle. The band again toured extensively following this release.

On August 23, 2007, the Phunk Junkeez released their most recent album, entitled Hydro Phonic. This album was also produced by Jumbo Jim and Valiente, engineered by Jumbo Jim, and mixed by Ken Mary.

Upon completing another tour of the U.S. and Japan, Valiente went on a solo tour of Japan. The Phunk Junkeez continue to play shows but have slowed their extensive touring, only playing select cities and dates.

== Members ==
Current members

- Joe Valiente "Soulman" (vocals) 1991–present
- Kirk Reznick "K-Tel Disco" (vocals) 1991–1995, 2016–present
- "Jumbo" Jim Woodling (bass guitar) 1992–present
- Jeff Scott "DJ Roachclip" (turntables/samples) 1992–present

Past members

- Mike Kramer (guitar) 1992–1993
- Jeff O'Rourke (guitar) 1994–1999, 2016–2018
- Danny P (guitar) 1999–2016
- Daniel Mueller (drums) 1992–2000, 2016–2018
- Mike Hill (drums) 2003–2016
- Jesse Valiente (vocals) 2001-2010

Touring and studio members

- Todd Mahoney (guitar) 1991
- Jeff Holmes (bass)
- Tony McClain (guitar) 1993
- Steve Dukes (drums) 2001–2002
- Richard Picklesworth (samples) 2000–2004

== Discography ==
=== Albums ===
Year	Title	Label
1992	Phunk Junkeez	Naked Language
1995	Injected	Interscope
1998	Fear of a Wack Planet	Trauma Records
1999	Junk E.P.	Uncle Scam Records
2001	Sex, Drugs and Rap N' Roll	Trauma
2003	Rock It Science	Suburban Noize
2007	Hydro Phonic	Dmaft
2010	The Greatest	Dmaft
2010	The '96 Lost Tapes	Download-only album

=== Singles ===
Year	Title	Peak chart positions	Label
Year	Title	AUS	Label
1993	"I Am a Junkee"	—	Naked Language
1995	"I Love It Loud"	88	Interscope
1995	"Snapped"	—	Interscope
1996	"Me n Yer Girl"	—	Interscope
1998	"Hazee"	—	Interscope
2001	"American Pimp/Bounce" (radio edit)	—	Uncle Scam
2003	"Everyday"	—	Suburban Noize
2007	"In the Summertime"	—	Dmaft

== Videography ==
Year	Title	Album
1992	"I Am a Junkee"	Phunk Junkeez
1995	"Snapped"	Injected
1996	"Me n Yer Girl"	Injected
1996	"I Love It Loud"	Injected
2000	"Bounce"	Sex, Drugs and Rap N' Roll
2003	"Magnetic Mic Control"	Rock It Science
2003	"Gangsta Rock"	Rock It Science
2007	"Join In"	Hydro Phonic
2007	"In the Summertime"	Hydro Phonic
2013	"Everyday"	The Greatest

== Filmography ==
Year	Title
2002	Bootlegs, Bong Rips, and Bad Videos
2005	Junkeez 4 Life
