= Eva Trout (band) =

- Origin: Sydney, New South Wales, Australia
- Genres: Alternative rock; pop rock
- Years active: 1993–2002
- Labels: Phantom; Trauma/Interscope; Origin/Shock
- Past members: Grant Shanahan; Bek-Jean Stewart; Steph Miller; Bert Thomson; Matt Galvin; Michael Carpenter

Eva Trout were an Australian alternative rock band formed in 1993 by mainstays Grant Shanahan on bass guitar and vocals, and Bek-Jean Stewart on lead vocals and acoustic guitar. They issued three studio albums, Along Woodland Rides, Through Tunnels of Evergreen (1995), Oberon (1999) and The Birds Album (2001) before disbanding in 2002.

== History ==
In 1993 bass guitarist, Grant Shanahan (ex-Slaybells, the Honeys, Catherine Wheel), was developing a new group in Sydney. He placed an ad for a lead guitarist, and it was answered by Bek-Jean Stewart, who played acoustic guitar and sang. She performed on a live radio broadcast, which he agreed to listen to and consequently hired her to form Eva Trout, ahead of another guitarist and vocalist. The band released a five-track, self-titled extended play in 1994.

In 1995 Steph Miller (ex-Roaring Jack) joined on mandolin and accordion ahead of their first studio album, Along Woodland Rides, Through Tunnels of Evergreen, for Phantom Records. During recording sessions their original drummer and guitarist left. Shanahan, Stewart and Miller continued with session musicians, Matt Galvin on lead guitar, and former bandmate, Bert Thomson (ex-the Honeys, Catherine Wheel) on drums. Galvin and Thomson joined the line-up of Eva Trout.

The group were signed to United States label, Trauma Records/Interscope Records (home to No Doubt and Bush), in 1996 after Atlanta radio station, WNNX, had added their track, "Beautiful South", to heavy rotation. The group undertook a US promotional tour including radio appearances. In January 1997 their debut album was re-recorded for US release in the following month as a self-titled album. While the band's exposure in the US seemed to poise it for success, label difficulties (Trauma/Interscope and No Doubt were involved in contractual and legal battles) prevented the band attaining a wider recognition.

The band released their second studio album, Oberon in 1999 via Origin Records/Shock Records. They recorded it over ten days in June on a farm, "Fernlee", near Oberon, New South Wales with Michael Carpenter as producer. The line-up was Galvin on guitars (acoustic, electric), keyboards and vocals; Miller on keyboards, mandolin, banjo, vocals and acoustic guitar; Shanahan on bass guitar and vocals; Stewart on lead vocals, acoustic guitar, harp and percussion; Thomson on drums was replaced by Carpenter for a track, "Light Sleeper". Thomson left the group and Carpenter joined.

Jasper Lee of Oz Music Project reflected on the album, "[they] return with a well crafted release full of tight pop/rock sounds interspersed with the occasional country tinge rubbed off from the album's title... [Stewart's] vocals have a dry sweetness to them, add in new backup vocals, the odd pedal steel twang and the album is made." They issued a four-track EP, Ruby's Gone, in the following year – its title track was the lead track on their second album. Lee had mused, "From the storytelling opener 'Ruby's Gone' to the marvellous light rock of 'Bright Eyed Century', [the group] prove that they were worth all the hype they once got – it's just a shame it never materialised into anything great." In 2001 the group's third studio album, The Birds Album, appeared. They disbanded late in 2002.

== Afterwards ==
Bek-Jean Stewart joined Perry Keyes' backing band, Give My Love to Rose, and provided drums and vocals for his albums, Meter (2005) and The Last Ghost Train Home (2007). Stewart's debut solo album, Junior Years, was issued in October 2007 and was declared Album of the Week by Radio National's Fran Kelly on her show, RN Breakfast. Former bandmates Matt Galvin on guitar and Grant Shanahan on bass guitar and as co-producer also appear on her album.

Stewart's second album, Winter, Summer Suburban Exile, appeared in November 2010. Tess Morro of Soulshine noticed, "[her] voice is natural, soulful and throaty, with a sweeping range of emotional power... [and her] keen eye captures the friends and lovers who populate her songs from the inside as well as out, giving her work its dispassion and its humanity... [it] is a remarkable release from one of Australia’s most original singer-songwriters." Shanahan also worked on Keyes' album, The Last Ghost Train Home, as co-producer. By June 2014 Shanahan had joined Keyes' backing band on bass guitar alongside Galvin on lead guitar.

== Discography ==
=== Studio albums ===
- Along Woodland Rides, Through Tunnels of Evergreen (1995) Phantom Records (PHCD-58)
  - Eva Trout (1997, re-recorded re-issue of previous album) Trauma Records/Interscope Records (78864-74000-2, INT3P-6236)
- Oberon (1999) Origin Records/Shock Records (OR053)
- The Birds Album (2001) Origin Records/Shock Records (OR065)

=== Extended plays ===
- Eva Trout (1994)
- Ruby's Gone (2000) Origin Records (ORO52)

=== Singles ===
- "Beautiful South" (1995)

=== Other appearances ===
- "Androgynous" on I'm in Love with that Song – A Tribute to the Replacements
