= Razorblade Suitcase =

1996 studio album by Bush

Studio album by Bush
- Released: 19 November 1996
- Recorded: 1996
- Studios: Sarm Hook End (Checkendon); Abbey Road (London)
- Genres: Grunge; post-grunge
- Length: 61:43
- Labels: Trauma; Interscope
- Producer: Steve Albini

Bush chronology
Sixteen Stone (1994)	Razorblade Suitcase (1996)	Deconstructed (1997)

Singles from Razorblade Suitcase
- 1. "Swallowed" Released: 22 October 1996; 2. "Greedy Fly" Released: 26 May 1997; 3. "Bonedriven" Released: 20 October 1997; 4. "Cold Contagious" Released: December 1997 (Aus)

Razorblade Suitcase is the second studio album by English rock band Bush. It was released on 19 November 1996 by Trauma and Interscope Records in the United States and Europe and on 20 January 1997 in the United Kingdom. The follow-up to their 1994 debut Sixteen Stone, it was recorded at Abbey Road Studios in London with engineer and producer Steve Albini. Its sound is more raw than that of its predecessor and has frequently been compared to Nirvana's In Utero (1993), which was also produced and engineered by Albini.

Razorblade Suitcase debuted at number one on the US Billboard 200, selling 293,000 copies in its first week of sales in the United States. To date, it remains the only Bush album to top the Billboard 200. The twentieth anniversary of the album was marked with a reissue officially titled Razorblade Suitcase (In Addition) on 16 December 2016, including the remastered album and four rare bonus tracks: "Broken TV", "Old", "Sleeper" and "Bubbles".

In 2025, Lauryn Schaffner of Loudwire named the album the best post-grunge release of 1996.

== Recording and production ==
Gavin Rossdale wrote most of the songs for Razorblade Suitcase in under one month. "Swallowed", along with others from the album, were written while on the road. In an interview with the Deseret News published on 2 January 1997, Rossdale explained:

"I was trying to write songs while my life was falling apart. While my longtime girlfriend of five years was leaving and packing in one room, I was writing in the other room."

The band chose Steve Albini to produce the album. In an interview with Spin during the final stages of the recording process Rossdale was quoted as saying that Albini "has been more important to me in terms of records I've listened to than any other person." Around the same time Albini declared that he put more time and energy into Razorblade Suitcase than he had with any previous albums.

== Content ==
Described as a grunge album by Entertainment Weekly, Razorblade Suitcase invited strong comparisons to the music of Nirvana, whose final album In Utero had been produced by Albini in 1993. "Swallowed" and "Bonedriven" in particular conjured a description of "irresistibly reminiscent" of Nirvana. "Straight No Chaser" was opined by The A.V. Club to be the "sister ballad" to the band's earlier hit "Glycerine".

Nicholas Slayton of Medium opined that the lyrics of Razorblade Suitcase "focused on three main ideas and problems": being trapped in situations with no way out, fallout from relationships, and loneliness.

=== "Personal Holloway" ===
"Personal Holloway", according to Slayton, reflected lament for societal norms forced on women. In 1999, Gavin Rossdale stated that the song was about a female friend who attempted to commit suicide; the song contains references to paracetamol as a result. It contains the lyric "deaf and dumb with the lights on, married by signs", which was inspired by list of all the people who'd lived in an English country house, at which Rossdale stayed, for the past 300 years; one couple from around 200 prior were listed as "deaf and dumb, married by signs".

=== "Swallowed" ===
Gavin Rossdale commented in 2017 that the lead-single, "Swallowed", reflected "massive success after failing for years".

=== "Insect Kin" ===
"Insect Kin" has been described by Rossdale as being "mood, pure mood". The song's lyrics mention vicodin, an opiate pain medication, and Red Stripe, a brand of lager beer, which Rossdale explained "were pretty much what I lived on when my stomach was really bad". "Insect Kin" contains references to Rossdale's previous love interest Courtney Love, particularly in the lyric "it's all the pain in the way she walks, it's all the pain in her wave goodbye".

=== "Cold Contagious" ===
"Cold Contagious" musically has been compared to the work of Neil Young. Rossdale has introduced the song at live performances as being "about revenge", although Rossdale has stated that the song is about several subjects, including seeing households fall apart following the breakup of relationships.

=== "History" ===
"History" was themed around abortion.

== Promotion ==
In 1997, Bush embarked on a worldwide tour, the Razorblade Suitcase Tour, to promote the album. Stretching from late January into November of that year, it took the band through Europe, North America, South America, Asia, and Australia. It included stops at many major music festivals around the world, including Glastonbury Festival, Pinkpop Festival, Reading Festival, Rock am Ring, Rock im Park, and Pukkelpop.

== Release and reception ==
Razorblade Suitcase was released on November 19, 1996, through Trauma Records. It debuted at number one on the Billboard 200, selling 293,000 copies in its first week. It remained at number one during its second week of release in the US. The album also debuted at number one in Canada, with first-week sales of 45,900 copies. Despite the album selling fewer copies than Sixteen Stone in the US, it marked a commercial peak for the band in their native Britain, where it reached number four on the UK Albums Chart.

The band originally planned to release the album in early 1997 but decided it would be better for a late 1996 release, especially considering that U2's next album was pushed into 1997.

The lead single from the album, "Swallowed", was released in October 1996 and was a huge success in the US, holding the number one spot on the US Billboard Modern Rock Tracks chart for 7 weeks. It remains the band's longest charting number one single. "Swallowed" also marked the commercial peak for the band in their native United Kingdom's singles charts, where it made number 7.

"Greedy Fly" was the second single released from Razorblade Suitcase and reached number three on the US Modern Rock Tracks chart. The singles "Swallowed" and "Greedy Fly" peaked at number seven and number twenty-two, respectively, on the UK Singles Chart.

"Bonedriven" and "Cold Contagious" followed as singles but did not make an impact on the charts.

"Mouth" was remixed and later released as a single from the band's 1997 album Deconstructed. The remixed version reached number five on the US Modern Rock Tracks chart. "Mouth" is featured on the soundtrack and in the film An American Werewolf in Paris. The "Mouth" music video features Julie Delpy, who also starred in the film.

=== 20th anniversary reissue ===
The 20th anniversary of Razorblade Suitcase was marked by a reissue, officially titled Razorblade Suitcase (In Addition). It was released digitally on 16 December 2016, and on vinyl on 10 February 2017. The reissue includes the remastered album and four rare bonus tracks: "Broken TV", "Old", "Sleeper", and "Bubbles". Prior to the reissue, three of the four bonus tracks had been released as B-sides ("Broken TV" with "Swallowed" and "Old" with "Greedy Fly") or found on compilations, but "Sleeper" had never received a proper release. The vinyl release of the reissue is on 180-gram black-and-white swirl vinyl and comes housed in a metallic silver gatefold cover with re-interpreted artwork, a poster of lyrics (including the songs that weren't on the original), and liner notes from producer Steve Albini.

== Critical reception ==
Professional ratings
Review scores
Source	Rating
AllMusic	3.5/5 stars
Entertainment Weekly	C
The Independent	(Negative)
Rolling Stone	2/5 stars
NME	1/10
Select	3/5 medals
Spin	5/10

Razorblade Suitcase received polarized reviews upon its release. Some critics dismissed the album because they felt that although the band attempted to distance themselves from bands like Nirvana and Pearl Jam in terms of their sound, they ultimately failed at creating a sound of their own. For example, Entertainment Weekly reviewer David Browne stated that some of the songs on the album could have easily been on the record Nirvana never made (due to Kurt Cobain's suicide). Andy Gill from The Independent also stated that portions of the album are very reminiscent of Nirvana, citing songs such as "Swallowed" and "Bonedriven" as irresistible reminders of Nirvana. Rolling Stone's Matt Diehl criticized the album at the time of its release, giving the album two out of five stars. Johnny Cigarettes from NME gave the album an extremely negative review, rating it 1/10 "for spelling their name right on the top of the record". However, Razorblade Suitcase was not criticized by all critics. Select magazine gave the effort three out of five stars.

AllMusic's Stephen Thomas Erlewine stated:

"The problem is that Gavin Rossdale has not come up with any hooks, which means that while Razorblade Suitcase is more pleasing and visceral on the surface, it offers no hooks to make it memorable, unlike the hit singles from Sixteen Stone."

== Packaging ==
The album's working title was Ghost Medicine but was changed for unknown reasons. The title Razorblade Suitcase comes from the lyrics of the song "Synapse" and is lead singer Gavin Rossdale's interpretation of "emotional baggage." The album artwork was by Vaughan Oliver and Adrian Philpott. Oliver had previously created the artwork for the Pixies' Surfer Rosa, which was also produced by Steve Albini.

== Track listing ==
All songs written by Gavin Rossdale

No.	Title	Length
1.	"Personal Holloway"	3:23
2.	"Greedy Fly"	4:30
3.	"Swallowed"	4:51
4.	"Insect Kin"	4:27
5.	"Cold Contagious"	6:00
6.	"A Tendency to Start Fires" ( (Note: "A Tendency to Start Fires" does not appear on the LP version due to time constraints))	4:04
7.	"Mouth"	5:45
8.	"Straight No Chaser" ( (Note: "Straight No Chaser" does not appear on the LP version due to time constraints))	4:02
9.	"History"	4:17
10.	"Synapse" ( (Note: Synapse" does not appear on the LP version due to time constraints))	4:52
11.	"Communicator"	4:25
12.	"Bonedriven"	4:32
13.	"Distant Voices" (ends at 5:16; includes hidden track "Whatever/History Reprise")	6:39
Total length:		61:43

Japanese Edition
No.	Title	Length
14.	"Broken TV"	4:28

20th Anniversary Reissue
No.	Title	Length
14.	"Old"	2:50
15.	"Broken TV"	4:26
16.	"Sleeper"	4:19
17.	"Bubbles"	3:02

== Personnel ==
=== Bush ===
- Gavin Rossdale – lead vocals, rhythm guitar
- Nigel Pulsford – lead guitar, backing vocals
- Dave Parsons – bass
- Robin Goodridge – drums

=== Other musicians ===
- Perry Montague-Mason – violin
- Frank Schaefer – cello
- Winston – backing vocals
- Gavyn Wright – violin

=== Technical personnel ===
- Gavin Rossdale – string arrangements
- Nigel Pulsford – arranger, string arrangements
- Steve Albini – engineer, producer
- Tom Elmhirst – assistant engineer
- Paul Hicks – assistant engineer
- Paul Palmer – mixing
- Robert Vosgien – mastering
- Glen Lutchford – photography
- Timothy O'Donnell – design assistant
- Vaughan Oliver – art direction, design
- Adrian Philpott – art direction, design
- Gavyn Wright – string arrangements
- David j. Holman – mixing
- Mixed – Cactus Studio Hollywood

== Charts ==
=== Weekly charts ===
Chart (1996–97)	Peak position
Australian Albums (ARIA)	12
Austrian Albums (Ö3 Austria)	13
Belgian Albums (Ultratop Flanders)	38
Belgian Albums (Ultratop Wallonia)	43
Canadian Albums (Billboard)	1
Dutch Albums (Album Top 100)	31
European Albums (European Top 100 Albums)	11
Finnish Albums (Suomen virallinen lista)	23
German Albums (Offizielle Top 100)	37
Icelandic Albums (Tónlist)	6
New Zealand Albums (RMNZ)	10
Portuguese Albums (AFP)	11
Scottish Albums (Official Charts)	7
Swedish Albums (Sverigetopplistan)	43
UK Albums (OCC)	2
UK Rock & Metal Albums (Official Charts)	1
US Billboard 200	1

=== Year-end charts ===
Chart (1996)	Position
Canadian Albums Chart	42
Chart (1997)	Position
Canadian Albums Chart	41
Canadian Hard Rock Albums (Nielsen Soundscan)	2
Dutch Albums Chart	90
US Billboard 200	11

== Certifications ==
Region	Certification	Certified units/sales
Australia (ARIA)	Gold	35,000^{^}
Canada (Music Canada)	5× Platinum	500,000^{^}
New Zealand (RMNZ)	Gold	7,500^{^}
United Kingdom (BPI)	Gold	100,000^{^}
United States (RIAA)	3× Platinum	3,000,000^{^}
^{^} Shipments figures based on certification alone.
