= The Science of Things =

Studio album by Bush
- Released: 26 October 1999
- Recorded: 1998
- Studios: Mayfair Studios, Westside Studios, Whitfield St., Air Studios, Sarm Hook End & Nigel Pulsford's home
- Genres: Grunge; hard rock
- Length: 51:14
- Labels: Trauma; Interscope
- Producers: Gavin Rossdale; Clive Langer; Alan Winstanley

Bush chronology
Deconstructed (1997)	The Science of Things (1999)	Golden State (2001)

Singles from The Science of Things
- 1. "The Chemicals Between Us" Released: 14 September 1999; 2. "Letting the Cables Sleep" Released: 18 January 2000; 3. "Warm Machine" Released: 11 February 2000

The Science of Things is the third studio album by British band Bush, released on 26 October 1999, through Trauma Records. The last Bush album released through Trauma, peaked at number eleven on the US Billboard 200 and has been certified platinum by both the RIAA and Music Canada. It is the penultimate Bush studio album to feature Dave Parsons and Nigel Pulsford.

The Science of Things incorporated electronic elements into Bush's hard rock sound; particularly on the album's lead single "The Chemicals Between Us", which was released on 14 September 1999 in anticipation of the album. Broadly following a science fiction motif, the album's lyrical themes ranged from the 1980 murder of Dorothy Stratten, the election of Tony Blair in the UK, and environmental damage.

== Background ==
In 1998, Gavin Rossdale retreated to a countryside house in Ireland to write demos for a new Bush album. The album was recorded over 4 weeks, at a variety of locations including lead guitarist Nigel Pulsford's home and Mayfair Studios in London. The album's musical direction of integrating electronic elements into a rock sound was, according to drummer Robin Goodridge, influenced by Deconstructed, a 1997 remix album of Bush's music.

Rossdale stated in 1999 that The Science of Things was so-named because the phrase was "a mixture of the specific, science, and the non-specific, things", a combination that Rossdale felt was "personal, and somehow intimate".

Following completion towards the end of 1998, the release of The Science of Things was delayed after the band was met with a US$40 million lawsuit from their label Trauma Records, claiming "breach of contract and nondelivery of the album". A settlement between Bush and Trauma was agreed in June 1999.

== Music ==
=== Style ===
Outlined by MTV to temper a "love of experimentation with a healthy dose of hard rock", in December 1999, SPIN opined that The Science of Things featured a sound "bolstered" by sporadic drum-loops and electronic effects, and that the music had the "polish" of the band's 1994 debut album Sixteen Stone, and the "energy" of Razorblade Suitcase.

=== Lyrics ===
Gil Kaufman of MTV News commented in October 1999 that The Science of Things was forged around "a vaguely science-fiction" narrative, as well as reflecting what he proclaimed to be Rossdale's "lyrical fascination with doomed relationships and the decay of modern society". "Spacetravel" was written reflecting Rossdale's feeling of detachment from being in Ireland during Tony Blair's earliest months as Prime Minister of The UK, while "Dead Meat" related to the abusive death of Canadian model Dorothy Stratten in 1980. "Disease of the Dancing Cats" was environmentally-themed; Rossdale stated in 1999 that the song was written about Minamata disease from mercury poisoning.

== Reception ==
Professional ratings
Review scores
Source	Rating
AllMusic	3.5/5 stars
Entertainment Weekly	D
New York Post	Mixed
NME	2.5/5 stars
Rolling Stone	2/5 stars

Stephen Thomas Erlewine of AllMusic gave a largely mixed review of The Science of Things. Although praising the record as "crafted and sequenced" and "nicely flowing", and proclaiming it superior to Razorblade Suitcase, Erlewine arraigned the record's lack of "emotional nor musical substance to make a lasting impact".

In October 1999, Dan Aquilante of New York Post, though remarking upon signs of promise in the single "The Chemicals Between Us", and commenting that the track "English Fire" had potential for live performances, gave the view that the "main problem" with the record was that the songs were not "created equally".

NME praised the album track "English Fire", but dismissed much of the music on The Science of Things as "staggeringly unimaginative modern-rock-by-numbers".

Karen Schoemer gave overwhelmingly negative feedback in Rolling Stone in November 1999. Although acknowledging the band's attempts to differentiate their style, Schoemer commented that The Science of Things sounded "exactly like the records that came before".

=== Retrospective ===
In July 2023, Stephen Hill of LouderSound included The Science of Things in a list of "10 terrible grunge albums with one classic song", describing the album as "forgettable", though noting the lead single "The Chemicals Between Us" as a standout.

== Track listing ==
All songs written by Gavin Rossdale.

No.	Title	Length
1.	"Warm Machine"	4:26
2.	"Jesus Online"	3:44
3.	"The Chemicals Between Us"	3:37
4.	"English Fire"	3:31
5.	"Spacetravel"	4:45
6.	"40 Miles from the Sun"	3:39
7.	"Prizefighter"	5:41
8.	"The Disease of the Dancing Cats"	4:01
9.	"Altered States"	4:10
10.	"Dead Meat"	4:16
11.	"Letting the Cables Sleep"	4:36
12.	"Mindchanger"	4:48
Total length:		51:20

Japanese edition bonus track
No.	Title	Length
13.	"Homebody"	4:20
Total length:		55:40

Unreleased tracks
No.	Title	Length
1.	"Ban the Bomb" (Instrumental)
2.	"Learning to Swim"	4:59
3.	"Break on Through (To the Other Side)" (The Doors cover)

== Allusions ==
- In an interview, Gavin Rossdale revealed that the song "Letting the Cables Sleep" was written for a friend who had contracted HIV. This song appeared in a season six episode of ER entitled "Such Sweet Sorrow", which featured the final appearances of George Clooney and Julianna Margulies.
- The second season of Charmed contained two songs from the album. In the episode "Awakened", the single "The Chemicals Between Us" plays in the background at P3 while "Letting the Cables Sleep" is heard at the end of the episode "Astral Monkey" where a distraught Piper cries over the loss of her doctor.
- Apocalyptica has remixed the song "Letting the Cables Sleep".
- "Spacetravel" features backing vocals by Rossdale's former wife, Gwen Stefani.
- The song "Dead Meat" is referenced in the No Doubt song "Ex-Girlfriend".
- In the 1938 novella Anthem by Ayn Rand, the protagonist and narrator states that his favorite subject in school is "The Science of Things," the title of this album.

== Personnel ==
Bush

- Gavin Rossdale – lead vocals, rhythm guitar
- Nigel Pulsford – lead guitar, backing vocals
- Dave Parsons – bass
- Robin Goodridge – drums

Additional musicians

- Sacha Puttnam – piano and string arrangements on "Letting the Cables Sleep", strings on "English Fire" and "40 Miles From the Sun"
- Claire Ashby – violin on "Letting the Cables Sleep"
- Alison Dodds – violin on "Letting the Cables Sleep"
- David Lasserson – viola on "Letting the Cables Sleep"
- Rosie Wetters – cello and string arrangements on "Letting the Cables Sleep"
- Gwen Stefani – vocals on "Spacetravel"
- Claudia Fontayne – backing vocals on "Jesus Online"
- Winston – barks on "Altered States" (uncredited)

Technical personnel

- Gavin Rossdale – design
- Clive Langer – production, mixing, additional engineering on "The Chemicals Between Us" and "Letting the Cables Sleep"
- Alan Winstanley – production, mixing, additional engineering on "The Chemicals Between Us" and "Letting the Cables Sleep"
- Tom Elmhirst – engineering and mixing on "The Chemicals Between Us" and "Letting the Cables Sleep", Pro Tools and additional recording
- David J. Holman – mixing on "Warm Machine", "Jesus Online" and "Prizefighter"
- Paul Palmer – mixing on "Warm Machine", "Jesus Online" and "Prizefighter"
- Aidan Love – programming
- Jony Rockstar – programming
- Robert Vosgien – mastering
- Kim Holt – cover photo
- Chris Cuffaro – photography
- Peter Black – photography
- C.B. Smith – photography
- Kevin Westerberg – photography
- Mixed at Cactus Studio Hollywood – "Warm Machine", "Jesus Online" and "Prizefighter"

== Charts ==
=== Weekly charts ===
Weekly chart performance for The Science of Things
Chart (1999)	Peak position
Australian Albums (ARIA)	70
Austrian Albums (Ö3 Austria)	18
Belgian Albums (Ultratop Flanders)	49
Canadian Albums (Billboard)	6
Dutch Albums (Album Top 100)	48
European Albums Chart	33
German Albums (Offizielle Top 100)	19
New Zealand Albums (RMNZ)	36
Scottish Albums (Official Charts)	33
Swiss Albums (Schweizer Hitparade)	99
UK Albums (Official Charts)	28
US Billboard 200	11

=== Year-end charts ===
Year-end chart performance for The Science of Things
Chart (2000)	Position
US Billboard 200	150

== Certifications ==
Certifications for The Science of Things
Region	Certification	Certified units/sales
Canada (Music Canada)	Platinum	100,000^{^}
United States (RIAA)	Platinum	1,000,000^{^}
^{^} Shipments figures based on certification alone.
