= Trauma Records =

1993–2004 American record label

- Parent company: Interscope Records
- Founded: 1993; 32 years ago
- Founder: Paul Palmer, Rob Kahane, David J Holman
- Status: Inactive
- Country of origin: United States
- Location: Los Angeles
- Official website: www.trauma2.com

Trauma Records was a Los Angeles–based independent record label created in 1993 by Paul Palmer and Rob Kahane.

Trauma Records had a joint venture agreement with Interscope Records that included financing and distribution through Interscope Records. Trauma signed and developed bands such as Bush, No Doubt, Phunk Junkeez, and The Flys. Trauma's Bush catalog was transferred to Kirtland Records in 2005.

In 2000, German media company IN-motion AG acquired a 51% stake in Trauma Records, aiming to integrate the label into its international music operations. The stake was sold back to the founders in 2002, but IN-motion AG retained European distribution rights for Trauma’s catalog and future releases.

Trauma Records was the label under which NBA superstar Shaquille O'Neal released his hip-hop albums. However, his most anticipated album, Shaquille O'Neal Presents His Superfriends, Vol. 1 was never released. It also released several soundtracks to popular films starring Mary-Kate and Ashley Olsen such as Holiday in the Sun and When in Rome.

In 2004 Trauma Records became a subsidiary of Interscope Records, and is currently inactive with no website or current address. Interscope has all but phased out the label following its decline in management and sales.

The label has been reactivated as Trauma2 Records but their website has been off-line since September 2018.

Kahane now manages Bush, whom he signed to the original label.

== Controversies ==
In 1997, Trauma sued Interscope for $100 million when Interscope laid claim to No Doubt's contract, which Trauma asserted had been transferred to Trauma in 1995. The suit was settled out of court, allowing Trauma to retain the group's recording rights and obtain $3 to $5 million in cash.

In 1999 the label sued Bush for breach of contract seeking US$40 million when they delayed their release of The Science of Things. In 2001 they left the label and signed to Atlantic Records.

== Artists ==
- Bush
- No Doubt
- Phunk Junkeez
- Louie Louie
- Janus Stark
- The Flys
- Bree Sharp

== See also ==
- List of record labels
