= Singson =

Singson is a surname. Notable people with the surname include:

- Floro Singson Crisologo (1908–1970), Filipino lawyer and politician
- Eric Singson (born 1948), Filipino businessman and politician
- Chavit Singson (born 1941), Filipino politician
- Dale Singson (born 1975), Filipino professional basketball player
- Gabriel C. Singson, Governor of Bangko Sentral ng Pilipinas (BSP) from 1993 to 1999
- Jerry Singson (born 1948), the incumbent Vice Governor of Ilocos Sur
- Kristine Singson-Meehan, (born 1973), Filipino politician
- Melanio Singson (1914–1992), Filipino lawyer and politician
- Rogelio Singson (born 1948), former Philippine Secretary of Public Works and Highways
- Ronald Singson (born 1968), Filipino politician, businessman and concert
- Richelle Singson-Michael (born 1981), Filipino politician and businesswoman
- Ryan Luis Singson (born 1980), Filipino politician

== See also ==
- Simson (disambiguation)
- Sing Song (disambiguation)
- Singsongs
- Swinson (disambiguation)
