= Simpson's (disambiguation) =

Simpson's is a defunct Canadian department store chain.

Simpson's may also refer to:

- Simpson's Hospital, Dublin, Ireland, now a nursing home
- Simpson's-in-the-Strand, London, a restaurant
- Simpson's Tavern, pub and restaurant in the City of London

== See also ==
- Simpson (disambiguation)
- The Simpsons (disambiguation)
  - The Simpsons, American animated TV sitcom
- Simpsons of Piccadilly, a clothing store in London
