= The Simpsons (disambiguation) =

The Simpsons is an American television series created by Matt Groening.

The Simpsons may also refer to:

- Simpson family, the main family on The Simpsons
- The Simpsons (franchise)
- Lego The Simpsons, Lego theme
- The Simpsons Movie, a 2007 film

== Gaming ==
- The Simpsons (pinball), a 1990 pinball game
- The Simpsons (video game), a 1991 arcade game
- The Simpsons Game, a 2007 video game

== Other ==
- The Simpsons Ride, as of 2008, a theme park attraction housed at Universal Studios Florida and Universal Studios Hollywood

== See also ==
- Simpson (disambiguation)
- Simpsons (department store), Canadian department store
- Simpsons of Piccadilly, a clothing store in London
- Simpson's (disambiguation)
  - Simpson's-in-the-Strand, a restaurant in London
  - Simpson's Tavern, a pub and restaurant in the City of London
  - Simpson's Hospital, Dublin, Ireland, a nursing home
