= Hamburg Records =

German record label

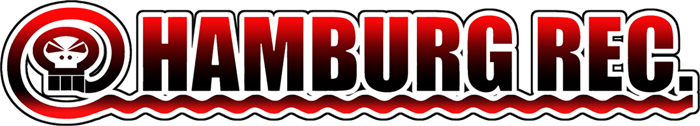
- Founded: 2002
- Founder: Flo V. Schwarz
- Distributor: Worldwide
- Genre: Punk rock, metal
- Country of origin: Germany
- Official website: hamburgrecords.com

Hamburg Records is a Hamburg, Germany-based independent record label and artist management owned by Pyogenesis frontman Flo V. Schwarz.

== History ==
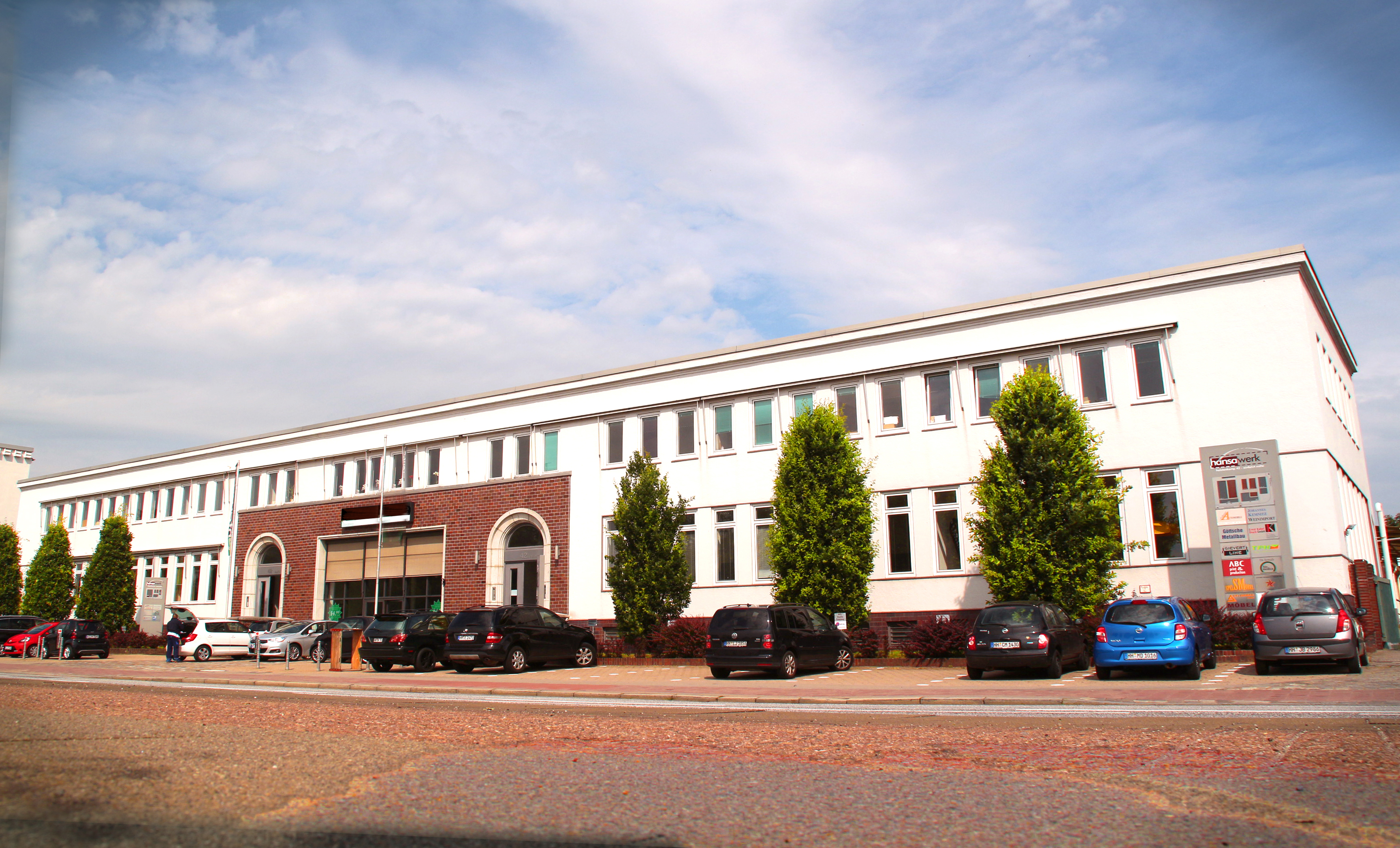
Hamburg Records Office in Hamburg, Germany, 2012

Flo V. Schwarz, who has been working in the music industry in companies such as Nuclear Blast long before, originally set up the label to exploit the Pyogenesis-rights after the band's contract ran out in 2002, but the company has evolved into a bigger and respected business. Throughout the 2000s, the company included an artist management department, while the musically focus was on any kind of Rock, particularly on Punk. In 2004 Hamburg Records, based at the world famous red-light district St. Pauli Reeperbahn, started their mail-order with just management and label attached band products. Throughout the years this changed and the company runs that business for quite a few namable bands and music-affine brands. Since 2006 Hamburg Records offers with Shirtagentur the service to print all kinds of merchandising and grew within just a few years to one of the biggest suppliers, especially for all kinds of Punk, Rock and Metal bands in Central Europe. In 2010 after being partners in co-publishing with EMI and Warner, for a few years already, Hamburg Records started their own publishing named Glorious Songs. The first signing was the Top40 chart-success of Itchy Poopzkid "Lights Out London".

Most of the bands on Hamburg Records, especially those who sing in German, are concentrated on the European markets, but the activities for a few bands are yet territorially unlimited.

== Current and former artists ==
- Atlas Losing Grip
- Bombshell Rocks
- Blitzkid
- Bloodhound Gang
- Donots
- Eisbrecher
- Exploited
- Emil Bulls
- Itchy Poopzkid
- Lacrimosa
- Lord of the Lost
- Megaherz
- Oomph!
- Pyogenesis
- Samiam
- ZSK

== See also ==
- Pyogenesis
- List of record labels
