= Simpson =

Simpson may refer to:

== Businesses and organizations ==
=== Businesses ===
- Simpson (appliance manufacturer), former manufacturer and brand of whitegoods in Australia
- Simpson Investment Company, an American holding company, formerly a forest products manufacturer
- Simpson Manufacturing Company, an engineering firm and building materials producer in the United States
- Simpson Performance Products, an American motorsports parts supplier
- Simpson Thacher & Bartlett, a law firm
- Simpsons (department store), a defunct Canadian department store
- Simpsons of Piccadilly, a defunct clothing store in London
- Simpson's-in-the-Strand, one of London's oldest traditional English restaurants

=== Schools ===
- Simpson College, in Indianola, Iowa
- Simpson University, in Redding, California

== People and fictional characters ==
- Simpson (name), a British surname
- Simpson family, of the animated television series The Simpsons

== Places ==
=== Australia ===
- Simpson, Northern Territory, a locality
- Simpson, Victoria, a town
- Simpson Conservation Park, a protected area in South Australia
- Simpson Desert, a desert located in Queensland

=== Canada ===
- Simpson, Saskatchewan
- Simpson Pass, a mountain pass on the British Columbia-Alberta boundary
- Simpson Peak (Canada), the northernmost named peak in the Cassiar Mountains, British Columbia
- Simpson Peninsula, Nunavut
- Simpson River, a river in Kootenay National Park, British Columbia (also North Simpson River)
- Simpson's River, a historical name for the Nass River

=== United States ===
- Simpson, Arkansas
- Simpson, Illinois
- Simpson, Indiana
- Simpson, Kansas
- Simpson, Louisiana
- Simpson, Minnesota
- Simpson, Nevada
- Simpson, North Carolina
- Simpson County, Kentucky
- Simpson County, Mississippi
- Simpson Creek (disambiguation)
- Simpson Township (disambiguation)

=== Elsewhere ===
- Simpson, Milton Keynes, Buckinghamshire, England, United Kingdom
- Simpson Peak, a mountain in the Scott Mountains (Antarctica)
- Simpson River, Chile
- Cape Simpson (Greenland)

== Science and technology ==
- Simpson index, a diversity index in ecology
- Simpson's paradox, in statistics
- Simpson's rule, in mathematics
- Simpson point, a Paleoindian projectile point
- Simpson test, a test for the disease ocular myasthenia gravis

== See also ==
- Simson (disambiguation)
- Justice Simpson (disambiguation)
- Simpson Desert (disambiguation)
- The Simpsons (disambiguation)
