= The Destructors (band) =

British punk band

- Origin: Peterborough, England
- Genre: Punk rock
- Years active: 1977–1979 1980–1984, 2006–present
- Labels: Paperback, Carnage Benelux, Criminal Damage, Death Records, Illuminated, Radical Change, Rowdy Farrago, Captain Oi!
- Members: Andy McDonald; Graham Butt; Dave Colton; Steve Rolls; Rob Baylis; Ian Stapleton
- Past members: Allen Adams; Phil Atterson; Dip (Paul Wicks); Joe MacColl; Andrew Jackson; Andrew Butler; Neil Singleton; Dave Ivermee; Nigel Davis; Steve Crosby; Lee Reynolds

The Destructors are an English punk rock band from Peterborough, originally existing between 1977 and 1979 and then 1980 until 1984. They reformed as Destructors 666 in 2006 and then changed to The Destructors in 2009. The Destructors continue releasing their own brand of punk / skuzz / garage to this day.

== History ==
The band was formed by former 6ck 6ck 6ck members Allen Adams (vocals), Phil Atterson (guitar), and Dip (Paul Wicks) (bass) and various drummers including Steve Rolls and Dave Colton. Later the original band were complemented with a varying line-up including Andy Butler (drums) Andrew Jackson (guitar). Butler and Jackson left in 1978 to set up a new band called The Blanks. Some of Jackson's songs were used in later Destructors recordings. A Blanks 3 track EP featured the song Northern Ripper which Allen Adams wrote the words. In 1980 The Destructors name was resurrected by Adams with a new line-up of Neil Singleton (vocals), Andy McDonald (drums), and 'Dave Ivermee ' (rhythm guitar) Allen Adams(bass) and later Graham "Gizz" Butt (lead guitar, formerly of The System, among other bands) before their first release, 1982's Senseless Violence EP. Butt took on the job of writing about half of the band's music, with Adams writing the lyrics. Singleton remembered the songs: "They could be very complicated and a right bastard to remember. He also seemed to have a fixation with serial killers!". A series of EPs and two albums followed before 1984's final album Bomb Hanoi, Bomb Saigon, Bomb Disneyland. The band split shortly after Bomb Hanoi, their records never living up to their live shows, and the band members falling out. According to Singleton: "I don't think we ever made a really good record! They never ever lived up to our live shows; We were so much better on stage". Of the frictions within the band, Butt said: "Neil couldn't get on with Alan, and me and Dave didn't want Andy on drums any more. We weren't happy with Alan organising everything and neglecting his bass-playing role". Adams immediately formed a new band, Five Go Mad In Europe, and resurrected the band name as Destructors V in 1984. Singleton went on to front Trench Fever. Butt went on to form The Desecrators, joined English Dogs, and later formed Janus Stark and then The More I See, also playing guitar with The Prodigy.

The band name was resurrected again in 2006 as Destructors 666, with former members Adams, Dave Colton, and Steve Rolls ex of The Now joined by new members Steve Crosby and Lee Reynolds. Steve Crosby walked out of the studio one night and was never heard from again. Lee Reynolds left the band due to recording commitments with The 925's. Crosby and Reynolds were replaced by Ian Stapleton (bass) and Rob Baylis (drums). In 2009, the band returned to the original name of The Destructors.

Allen 'The Kid' Adams died on 12 November 2019.

== Discography ==
=== Destructors releases 1982–1984 ===
Date	Type	Name
1982	EP	"Senseless Violence EP" – Paperback (#33)
1982	EP	"Religion... There Is No Religion EP" – Carnage Benelux (#34)
1982	EP	"Jailbait EP" – Illuminated
1982	LP	"Exercise The Demons of Youth" – Illuminated (#12)
1983	EP	"Forces Of Law EP" – Illuminated (#26)
1983	LP	"Armageddon In Action" (live) – Radical Change (#10)
1983	EP	"Cry Havoc and Unleash The Dogs EP" – Criminal Damage (#31)
1983	LP	"Merry Christmas and Fuck Off" – Death Records
1983	EP	"Wild Thing", Four track EP – Illuminated Records, ILL1912
1983 (December)	EP	"Electronic Church" – free with "Trees and Flowers" magazine
1984 (January)	LP	"Bomb Saigon, Bomb Hanoi, Bomb Disneyland" – Carnage Benelux, KILL666

=== Destructors V release 1984 – Releases from the short-lived Destructors variable Destructors V ===
Date	Type	Name
1984 (August)	EP	"TV Eye" 3 Track E.P – Criminal Damage, CRI108

=== Destructors 666 releases 2006–2009 ===
Destructors 666 started as a one off project with the release of Plus Ca Change Pour La Meme Chose. However, all copies were sold due to the solid fanbase of the band and their strong legacy to the world of punk rock. The split EP is seen as something unique to The Destructors and provides an opportunity to showcase other local talent. All contributors retain full rights to their material and receive costs for recording as well as free copies of the finished CD's. Date EP's started as an idea around the 666 label (Released on the 6th day of the 6th month of the 6th year of the 21st century and continued every year, i.e. 777, 888 etc. Often these are split releases though not always. Concept EPs are another format and cover areas such as Police / CCTV / Witchcraft (Racial Intolerance) etc. Finally, full blown Destructors only releases.

Date	Type	Name
2006 (February)	Split EP	"Plus Ca Change Pour La Meme Chose" – CD (Rowdy Farrago, RF003) Split EP with The Ruined
2006 (June)	Date EP	"06:06:06" – CD (Rowdy Farrago, RF666)
2006 (August)	Split EP	"Sturm Und Drang" – CD (Rowdy Farrago, RF004) Split EP with The 925's
2006 (December)	Split EP	"Gott Mit Uns" – CD (Rowdy Farrago, RF005) Split EP with Radicus
2007 (March)	Split EP	"No Parasan" – CD (Rowdy Farrago, RF006, March 2007) Split EP with $UP
2007 (June)	Album	"Many Were Killed Few Were Chosen" – CD (Rowdy Farrago, RFA01)
2007 (July)	Date EP	"07:07:07" – CD (Rowdy Farrago, RF777)
2007 (September)	Split EP	"Biberati Ut Gothi" – (Rowdy Farrago, RF007) Split EP with Fletch Cadillac
2007 (November)	Concept EP	"Sichien Lassen Mit Fremdem Machten" – (Rowdy Farrago, RFEP1)Theme = Strange Things
2008 (February)	Split EP	"Caveat Emptor" – (Rowdy Farrago, RF008) Split EP with White Clouds & Gunfire
2008 (April)	Split EP	"Labor Omnia Vincit" – (Rowdy Farrago, RF009) Split EP with Eastfield
2008 (June)	Split EP	"Lex Talionis" – (Rowdy Farrago, RF010) Split EP with Dirty Love
2008 (August)	Date EP	"08:08:08" CD – (Rowdy Farrago, RF888)
2008 (September)	Split EP	"Geistbahn" – (Rowdy Farrago, RF011) Split EP with March To The Grave
2008 (October)	Concept EP	"Malleus Maleficarum" – (Rowdy Farrago, RFEP2)Theme = Witchcraft / Racial Intolerance
2008 (December)	Concept EP	"Bah Humbug" – (Rowdy Farrago, RFXMAS1) Theme = Christmas
2009 (March)	Split EP	"Deus Ex Machina" – (Rowdy Farrago, RF012) Split EP with Dun2Def
2009 (May)	Album	"Pow! That's Kill Musik 666 Volume 1: Revision" – CD (Rowdy Farrago, RFA02)
2009 (July)	Concept EP	"Quisnam Vigilo Vigilo" – (Rowdy Farrago, RFEP3)Theme = Control
2009 (August)	Split EP	"Scheikunde" – (Rowdy Farrago, RF013, August 2009) Split EP with Dangers Close
2009 (September)	Date EP	"09:-09:09" – CD (Rowdy Farrago, RF999) aka The Nein Nein Nein EP
		Destructors 666 renamed to The Destructors In November 2009

=== The Destructors releases 2009 – 2019 ===
The present day lineup of The Destructors. Continuing to release multi theme albums / EP's and split EP's

Date	Type	Name
2009 (November)	Split EP	"Tormentum Insomniae" – (Rowdy Farrago, RF014) Split EP with Sick On The Bus
2010 (April)	Concept EP	"Politika" – (Rowdy Farrago, RFELECT01) Theme = Politics
2010 (June)	Split EP	"Zengakuren" (Rowdy Farrago, RF015, June 2010) Split EP with The Black Marias
2010 (August)	Album	"Dead Beat To White Heat" – (Rowdy Farrago, RFA03)
2010 (October)	Date EP	"10:10:10 (The Meaning Of Life EP)" – (Rowdy Farrago, RF101010)
2010 (October)	Concept EP	"Helloween" – (Rowdy Farrago, RFHELL01) Theme = Halloween
2011 (January)	Split EP	"Les Fleur Du Mal" – (Rowdy Farrago, RF016) Split EP with Gripper
2011 (May)	Concept EP	"Media Studies"- (Rowdy Farrago, RFEP04) Theme = Media, Celebrity Culture, Journalism
2011 (August)	Split Album	"Wohlgefuhl" – (Rowdy Farrago, RFSA01) Split Album with Dun2Def
2011 (September)	Split EP	"Je Suis Radio" – (Rowdy Farrago, RF017) Split EP with Don't Look Down
2011 (November)	Date EP	"11:11:11 (In Memoriam)" – (Rowdy Farrago, RF111111)
2012 (January)	Album	"Pow! That's Kill Musik (Volume 2 Rewind)" (Rowdy Farrago, RFA04)
2012 (March)	Split EP	"C'etait La Guerre" – (Rowdy Farrago, RF018) Split EP with Beverly Kills
2012 (May)	Concept EP	"S&D&R&R" – (Rowdy Farrago, RFEP5) Theme = Sex & Drugs & Rock & Roll
2012 (July)	Split Album	"Schwerpunkt" – (Rowdy Farrago, RFSA02) Split album with Anarcho-Punk band 'The Astronauts'
2012 (September)	Split EP	"Pax Romanus" – (Rowdy Farrago, RF019) Split EP with Ziplock
2012 (December)	Date EP	"12:12:12 (Ragnarok)" – (Rowdy Farrago, RF121212)
2013 (April)	Split EP	"Sous Les Paves La Plage" – (Rowdy Farrago, RF020) Split EP with PMT
2013 (September)	Album	"The Sublime, The Perverse & The Ridiculous" – (Rowdy Farrago, RFDES01)
2013 (November)	Split EP	"Terrorismo" – (Rowdy Farrago, RF021) Split EP with The Dogtown Rebels
2014 (January)	Concept EP	"New York, New York" – (Rowdy Farrago, RFEP6) Theme = New York
2014 (March)	Date EP	"13:13:13 (Malchance)" – (Rowdy Farrago, RF131313)
2014 (May)	Split EP	"Divide Et Impera" – (Rowdy Farrago, RF022) Split EP with Cretin 77
2014 (July)	Concept EP	Dolor Goggler, – (Rowdy Farrago, RFEP7)
2015 (January)	Compilation Album	"The Destructors Greatest Misses" – (Rowdy Farrago, RFA05)
2015 (April)	Concept EP	"Politika 2" – (Rowdy Farrago, RFELECT02)
2015 (August)	Split EP	"Deus Luna" – (Rowdy Farrago, RF023) Split EP with The Malingerers
2016 (July)	Concept EP	"The Somme" – (Rowdy Farrago, RFAEP8)
2017 (March)	Album	"Pow! That's Kill Musik (Volume 3 Reflection)" – (Rowdy Farrago, RFA06)
2018 (July)	Album	"Punkopera" – (Rowdy Farrago, RFEP9)
2018 (October)	Album	"Punkopera" – (Rowdy Farrago, RFEP9V) Vinyl Only

== Band members timeline ==
This is an overview of the history of The Destructors. Now over 34 years old and still recording and releasing new material.

Date	Name	Members
1976	6CK 6CK 6CK	Allen Adams Aka "The Kid" (vocals), T.W atterson (guitar), Stuart Band (bass), Graham Black (drums)
1976	Speed Mark II	Allen Adams Aka "The Kid" (vocals), Steve Bavister (guitar), Paul Cooper (guitar), Dip (bass)
1976	6CK 6CK 6CK Mark II	Allen Adams Aka "The Kid" (vocals), T.W Atterson (guitar), Paul Cooper (guitar), Dip (bass)
1976	The Gestapo	Allen Adams Aka "The Kid" (vocals), T.W Atterson (guitar), Paul Cooper (guitar), Dip (bass), Andy Arthurs (drums)
1977	Destructors	Allen Adams Aka "The Kid" (vocals), T.W Atterson (guitar), Dip (bass), Joe MacColl/Steve Rolls/Dave Colton (drums at different times)
1978	Destructors Mark II	Allen Adams Aka "The Kid" (vocals), T.W Atterson (guitar), Dip (bass), Andrew Jackson (guitar), Andrew Butler (drums)
1978	Destructors Mark III	Allen Adams Aka "The Kid" (vocals), T.W Atterson (guitar), Dip (bass), Andrew Butler (drums)
1980	Destructors Mark IV	Neil Singleton (vocals), Dave Ivermee (guitar), Allen Adams Aka "The Kid" (bass), Andrew Butler (drums)
1980-1981	Destructors Mark V	Neil Singleton (vocals), Dave Ivermee (guitar), Allen Adams Aka "The Kid" (bass), Andy McDonald (drums)
1981-1983	Destructors Mark VII	Neil Singleton (vocals), Dave Ivermee (guitar), Graham "Gizz" Butt (guitar), Allen Adams Aka "The Kid" (bass), Andy McDonald (drums)
1983-1984	Destructors V (Mark VII)	Allen Adams Aka "The Kid" (vocals), Dave Colton (guitar), Nigel Davis (bass), Joe MacColl (drums)
1983-1984	Five Go Mad In Europe	Allen Adams Aka "The Kid" (vocals), Dave Colton (guitar), Faz Farrow (bass), Joe MacColl (drums)
2006-2007	Destructors 666 (Mark VIII)	Allen Adams Aka "The Kid" (vocals), Dave Colton (guitar), Steve Rolls (guitar), Steve Crosby (bass), Lee Reynolds (drums), Simon Stabler (sound locator)
2007-2008	Destructors 666 (Mark IX)	Allen Adams Aka "The Kid" (vocals), Dave Colton (guitar), Steve Rolls (guitar), Steve Crosby (bass), Rob Baylis (drums), Simon Stabler (sound locator)
2008	Destructors 666 (Mark X)	Allen Adams Aka "The Kid" (vocals), Dave Colton (guitar), Steve Rolls (guitar), Rob Baylis (drums), Tom Savage (bass)
2008-2009	Destructors 666 (Mark XI)	Allen Adams Aka "The Kid" (vocals), Dave Colton (guitar), Steve Rolls (guitar), Rob Baylis (drums), Ian Stapleton (bass)
2009-2019	The Destructors	Allen Adams Aka "The Kid" (vocals), Dave Colton (guitar), Steve Rolls (guitar), Rob Baylis (drums), Ian Stapleton (bass) + AC & Tom (Live)

Timeline
