= Where Legend Began =

Studio album by English Dogs
- Released: December 1986
- Recorded: Matrix Studios, London
- Genre: Heavy metal, thrash metal
- Length: 45:32
- Label: Under One Flag / Music for Nations
- Producer: English Dogs, Pete Gill

English Dogs chronology
Forward into Battle (1985)	Where Legend Began (1986)	Bow to None (1995)

Professional ratings
Review scores
Source	Rating
AllMusic	3/5 stars
Kerrang!	3/5 stars

Where Legend Began is the third studio album by British band English Dogs. It is probably the band's most successful album and the one that is most heavily influenced by thrash metal. It was released on the Under One Flag label late in 1986. A re-release ties "Trauma" and "The Eye of Shamahn" together as one song.

== LP track listing ==
All songs written by English Dogs (Adie, Gizz Butt, Wattie, Pinch), except where noted.

=== Side one ===
1. "Trauma" – 1:54
2. "The Eye of Shamahn" (English Dogs, Jon Murray) – 5:01
3. "Enter the Domain" – 5:01
4. "Premonition" – 5:58
5. "Calm Before the Storm" – 5:05

=== Side two ===
1. "Flashback" – 4:11
2. "A Tomb of Travellers Past" – 5:08
3. "Middle Earth" – 5:07
4. "Epilogue" – 8:08

== Personnel ==
- Ade "Adie" Bailey – lead vocals
- Gizz Butt – lead and rhythm guitars, backing vocals
- Mark "Wattie" Watson – bass, backing vocals
- Andrew "Pinch" Pinching – drums, percussion, backing vocals

Production

- Arranged by English Dogs
- Produced by English Dogs & Pete Gill
- Recorded, engineered & mixed by Jules Baby & Pete Gill
- Assistant engineers: Danthrax Smith

Design

Cover design by Duncan "Celt" Storr
