= Simpson Branch =

Simpson Branch may refer to:

- Simpson Branch (Loutre River), a stream in Missouri
- Simpson Branch (Mineral Fork), a stream in Missouri
