= Simpson Creek =

Simpson Creek may refer to:

- Simpson Creek (Missouri), a stream in Ripley County, Missouri, United States
- Simpson Creek (Niobrara River tributary), a stream in Keya Paha County, Nebraska
- Simpson Creek (West Virginia), a tributary of the West Fork River in West Virginia, United States

== See also ==
- Simpson Branch (disambiguation)
