= Flo V. Schwarz =

German musician

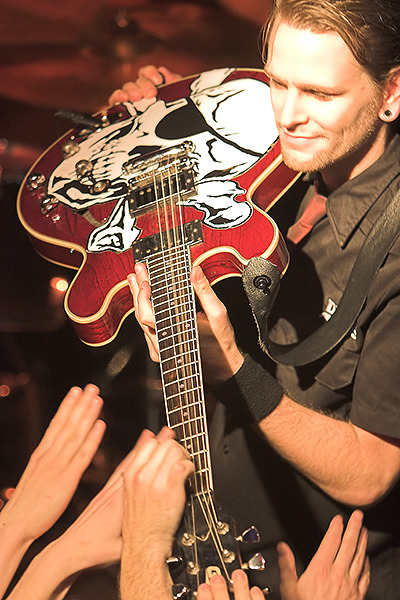

Background information
- Born: Heilbronn, Germany
- Genres: Gothic metal, heavy metal, death metal, punk rock
- Occupations: Musician, record producer, songwriter
- Instruments: Vocals, guitar
- Years active: 1991–present
- Label: Hamburg Records
- Member of: Pyogenesis
- Website: pyogenesis.com

Flo V. Schwarz (born 13 September) is a German musician, producer, songwriter, and the owner of Hamburg Records. In addition to his career as frontman of the band Pyogenesis, he is active as an entrepreneur in artist management, publishing, booking, and merchandise through his company Hamburg Records. Pyogenesis is considered a pioneering act in the gothic metal genre.

== Early life ==
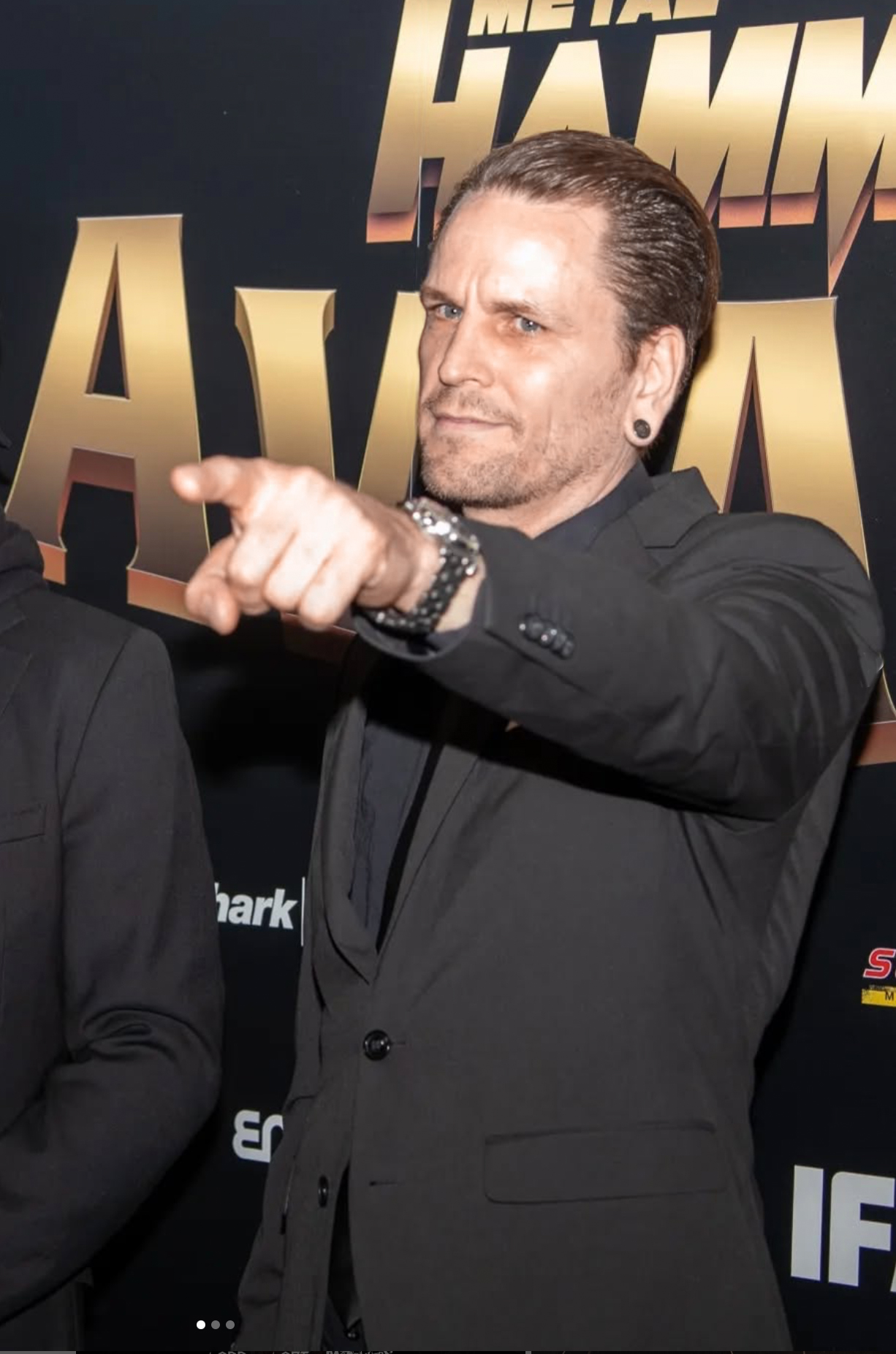
Schwarz on the "black carpet" at the Metal Hammer Awards 2024

Schwarz was born in Heilbronn and grew up there as well as in Stuttgart. During primary school, he placed second in the Baden-Württemberg state school choir championships. At the age of ten, he began piano lessons but did not continue with the instrument. He later attended the FLSH Schloss Gaibach, a boarding school in an old castle near Würzburg. In his youth, he played ice hockey. For his 14th birthday, he asked for an electric bass, inspired by the basslines of Depeche Mode — unaware they were played on synthesizers. That same year, he bought his first electric guitar, an Epiphone Flying V.

== Career ==
=== Pyogenesis ===
Schwarz rose to prominence in the early 1990s as the singer of the band Pyogenesis. With his blend of dark and melodic elements, he contributed to the development of gothic metal as an independent musical style with a global following. Pyogenesis has performed at major European festivals such as Rock am Ring, Rock im Park, Wacken Open Air, and Sziget Festival in Hungary, which attracted around 500,000 attendees. The band has also achieved international success, including a number 1 position on Mexico's import album charts, and continues to tour worldwide.

=== Hamburg Records ===
In 2000, Schwarz relocated from Stuttgart to Hamburg. In 2002, he founded Hamburg Records, a company specializing in artist management, publishing, booking, and merchandising. Bands affiliated with Hamburg Records have achieved several top 10 placements and number 1 positions on the German album charts.

Notable acts associated with the label include Eisbrecher, Feuerschwanz, Oomph!, Lacrimosa, Megaherz, Nachtblut, Anti-Flag or Itchy. A milestone event was the participation of Lord of the Lost as Germany's representative at the Eurovision Song Contest in 2023.

=== Other work ===
In the mid-1990s, Schwarz began working at Nuclear Blast as its sixth employee, where he designed artwork under the pseudonym Flea Black (a play on "Flo(h) Schwarz") for bands like Manowar, Dimmu Borgir, Children of Bodom, HammerFall, and In Flames. By the time he left in 1999 to tour with Pyogenesis, the company had grown to around 120 employees including part-time staff.

In summer 1997, he had a minor role in the Sat.1 TV series Katrin ist die Beste.

== Personal life ==
At age 19, Schwarz left the church and has identified as an atheist ever since.

Schwarz is the father of two daughters, born in 2009 and 2012.
