= Sing Song =

Sing Song may refer to:

- "Sing Song" by Christina Rossetti used in Moonlight Waltz
- Sing Song (EP), the title of the debut EP of the indie pop band The Little Ones
- "Sing Song" by Sudden Sway 1986
- "Sing Song" by The Tea Set 1979
