= English Dogs =

British hardcore punk band

Background information
- Origin: Grantham, England
- Genres: Hardcore punk, crossover thrash, heavy metal, thrash metal
- Years active: 1981–1987, 1993–1999, 2007–2016
- Website: officialenglishdogs.com

English Dogs were a British hardcore punk and heavy metal band formed in the early eighties. Two versions of the band existed: the punk and metal crossover band featuring original drummer Andrew "Pinch" Pinching and second-era members Graham "Gizz" Butt and Adie Bailey, and a punk-based one featuring original vocalist Pete "Wakey" Wakefield.

== History ==
English Dogs formed in October 1981 in Grantham and produced two demos during 1982, "Show No Mercy" and "Free to Kill". The band toured as support to fellow punk band Charged GBH in Germany during early 1983 and followed this with a British tour supporting Discharge. In 1983, they signed to Clay Records and released a six-track EP, Mad Punx and English Dogs, in July 1983.

English Dogs' first full-length album, Invasion of the Porky Men, was released a year later. Personnel changes ensued after the debut album emerged with vocalist Wakey departing to be replaced by ex-Ultraviolent singer Ade Bailey. At this juncture, the band also decided to augment their live and recorded sound by approaching Tracey Abbott of NWOBHM bands Overdrive / Witchfynde to work on new material for the To the Ends of the Earth EP. Abbott helped with the songwriting and added metal riffs but due to other commitments, he was unable to join the line-up so shortly after this they added former Destructors guitarist Graham "Gizz" Butt.

This change saw them leave Clay Records to sign with Rot Records and release the decidedly metal-tinged To the Ends of the Earth EP in September 1984. The metal leanings increased with Forward into Battle. English Dogs, culminating with the Metalmorphosis 12-inch and Where Legend Began album through Under One Flag in 1986. In Spring of that year, the Dogs toured the US to sold-out shows on both the East and West coast. Upon their return to the UK, Jon Murray left the band. The group appeared on the Shades promoted thrash bill at Camden's Electric Ballroom with Possessed and Voivod later in 1986. Pinch also left the band around Winter '86. The band carried on with Adie, Gizz and Wattie playing with other musicians until calling it a day late that year.

In 1993, Pinch and Gizz Butt reformed English Dogs with "Mad Punx" vocalist Wakey and Future Damned bassist Stuart West, signed to German label Impact Records and released Bow to None. Wakey left shortly after, with him being replaced by Stuart "Stu-Pid" Jones for the 1995 five-track EP, What a Wonderful Feeling... to Be Fucked by Everyone, on Retch Records.

Eventually English Dogs became a three-piece with the line-up of Gizz Butt on lead vocals and guitar, Pinch on drums and backing vocals, and Swapan "Shop" Nandi on bass and backing vocals. They released the 16-track crossover album, All the World's a Rage, also on Impact records, and toured the UK, Germany, Austria and Switzerland many times. In 1996, the English Dogs played their last shows as Pinch. Gizz and Shop were soon to re-emerge as Janus Stark.

An English Dogs and GBH union resulted in Wakey and Pinch creating The Wernt with GBH members guitarist Jock Blyth and bassist Ross Lomas for a 1997 album, Wreckin' Temples. Gizz Butt replaced Jim Davies of Pitchshifter as the live guitarist for The Prodigy, which in turn revitalised interest in English Dogs and prompted a re-release of Where Legend Began. 1999's I've Got a Gun was recorded live in Finland in 1994 when Pid was on vocals. By 2000, Pinch had joined The Damned. Gizz Butt returned in 2002 with The More I See.

In May 2007, English Dogs reformed with the original line-up with the exception of Pinch, who was drumming for The Damned. He was replaced by Stuart Meadows, who played for Resistance 77. They mainly play throughout Europe, but they do not play their crossover material. English Dogs released an EP called Tales of the Asylum in November 2008.

English Dogs had another line-up change in 2009, then went on hiatus.

In 2011, three original members of the 1984 crossover line-up announced they were going to reform to perform the Forward into Battle and To the Ends of the Earth releases in their entirety. This led to a sell-out tour which received great reviews. After the tour, they announced they were to write new material in the vein of the crossover material and plan more touring.

A new English Dogs album, The Thing with Two Heads, was released on Candlelight Records in July 2014.

== Musical style ==
In their early days, the band played hardcore punk reminiscent of bands like Discharge and Black Flag. From the EP To the Ends of the Earth (1984) onwards, thrash metal influences became increasingly prominent. This was mainly due to the addition of guitarist Graham "Gizz" Butt and singer Adie Bailey, who had a rougher, higher-pitched voice. The album Forward into Battle (1985) has drawn comparisons to metal bands such as Voivod, Warfare, Tank, and Venom, whereas hardcore influences are hardly audible anymore. The band also sounds like Corrosion of Conformity in places. On Where Legend Began (1987), the band had completely turned away from hardcore punk and towards heavy metal, after having played a mixture of thrash metal and hardcore punk on the EP Metalmorphosis (1986).

== Members ==
First line-up

- Pete "Wakey" Wakefield – vocals
- Jon Murray – guitar
- Mark "Wattie" Watson – bass
- Andrew "Pinch" Pinching – drums

Forward into Battle line-up

- Adie Bailey – vocals
- Graham "Gizz" Butt – lead guitar
- Jon Murray – guitar
- Mark "Wattie" Watson – bass
- Andrew "Pinch" Pinching – drums

Wakey line-up

- Pete "Wakey" Wakefield – vocals
- Nick Wynch – guitar
- Michael "Tat" Tatler – bass
- Richard "Grizz" Grizzwell – drums

Pinch-Gizz-Adie line-up

- Adie Bailey – vocals
- Graham "Gizz" Butt – lead guitar
- Ryan Christy – rhythm guitar
- Craig Christy – bass
- Andrew "Pinch" Pinching – drums
- Spike T. Smith – drums (since July 2014)

== Discography ==
=== Albums ===
- Invasion of the Porky Men (Clay Records, 1984)
- Forward into Battle (Rot Records ASS20, 1985)
- Where Legend Began (Under One Flag Records FLAG4, 1987)
- Bow to None (Impact Records, 1994)
- All the World's a Rage (Impact Records, 1995)
- I've Got a Gun! Live in Helsinki (Retch Records, 1999)
- This Is Not a War (Retch Records, 2002)
- We Did, We Do, We Always Fucking Will (2014)
- The Thing with Two Heads (Candlelight Records, 2014)

=== Singles and EPs ===
- Demo '82 Tape (1982)
- Mad Punx and English Dogs 12" (Clay Records, 1983)
- To the Ends of the Earth 12" (Rot Records, 1984)
- Metalmorphosis 12" (Under One Flag Records 12FLAG101, 1986)
- Sei was du bist (Impact 1995)
- What a Wonderful Feeling to Be F**ked by Everyone (Retch Records, 1995)
- Tales from the Asylum (Retch Records 2008)
- Get Off My F***ing Moon (2011)
- Dog Sick split with Sick on the Bus (2012)

=== Compilation albums ===
- Have a Rotten Christmas Vol. 2 LP (Rot Records, 1985)
- Driven to Death LP (Clay Records, 1990)
- Angry Songs and Bitter Words CD (Ruptured Ambitions, 2003)
