= Gizz Butt =

British musician

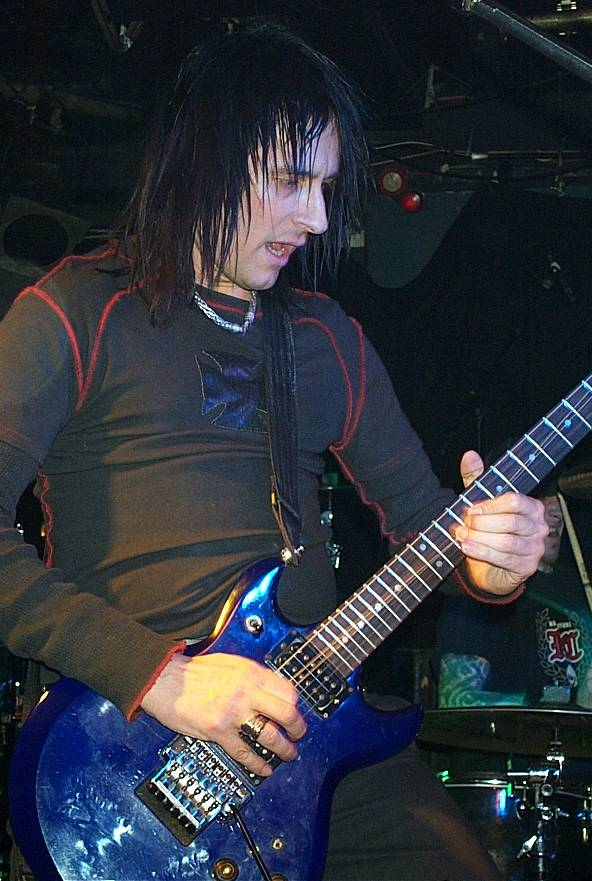
- Butt with The More I See in 2005

Background information
- Born: Graham Anthony Butt; 3 August 1966 (age 59); Manchester, England
- Genres: Punk rock, thrash metal, electronic
- Occupation: Musician
- Instruments: Guitar, vocals
- Years active: 1981–present
- Member of: Janus Stark, The More I See
- Formerly of: The Prodigy, The Destructors, English Dogs, Sabbat, Pyogenesis

Graham Anthony "Gizz" Butt (born 3 August 1966) is a British musician who is the lead vocalist and lead guitarist for the punk band Janus Stark. He is best known for being the live guitarist for The Prodigy in the late 1990s. His own band Janus Stark, from the same era, enjoyed a minor hit with the song "Every Little Thing Counts" from the album Great Adventure Cigar.

== Biography ==
Graham Anthony Butt acquired the nickname "Gizz" from the character of "Gizzard Puke" who appeared on The Kenny Everett Show. Coming from a musical background, Butt began playing the guitar at the age of eleven, taking lessons with a jazz guitarist in Manchester. In 1978, his family relocated to Peterborough, where Butt formed his first school band, The Northern Lights. Within a few months he changed the band name to The Exits, and wrote a whole 4 song set of original material including guitar solos. He turned the band into a three-piece called The System and began booking his own shows locally. He was recruited by another band, The Destructors. During the years from 1981 to 1983, Butt co-wrote and recorded a number of their singles (including "Senseless Violence", "Religion", "Jailbait", "Forces of Law" and "Wild Thing") and the albums (Exercise The Demons of Youth, Armaggedon in Action, Bomb Hanoi, Merry Xmas and F*** Off). By 1984 he had left The Destructors to join the English Dogs. While in The English Dogs he toured the United States, and it was at this time his fusion of punk and metal based guitar playing started to get him noticed by people such as Metallica and was helping to influence the thrash metal genre " a lot of the songs you hear on Forward Into Battle were actually written before the (preceding) To the Ends of the Earth EP, so we're talking about a very 'early days' punk metal fusion. It was the beginning of that scene, so you'll still hear a lot of the things that influenced the first English Dogs LP, or even stuff I wrote when I was in The Destructors in 1981–83". By 1987, the English Dogs came to a halt, and Butt formed another band, Wardance. Andy Sneap produced and mixed the album All The World's a Rage (1995).

Kerrang! magazine writer and photographer Morat mentioned Butt's name to The Prodigy and within two weeks he was playing T in the Park Festival. He toured with The Prodigy for three years when they were at their most successful. Butt formed Janus Stark in 1996, who had US chart success with "Every Little Thing Counts". Janus Stark released Great Adventure Cigar, which led to The Foo Fighters inviting Butt on stage to join them for a spell.

In 2003, Butt and Blair formed The More I See, a five-piece thrash metal band that released three albums: "The Wolves Are Hungry", "The Unholy Feast" and " The Disappearing Humans".

Butt performed with Sabbat, replacing original bassist Fraser Craske. He continued to perform with the band for the remainder of their 2007 festival appearances and all European and American dates in 2008.

In 2006, Butt began working with Steve Ignorant, founder of anarcho-punk band Crass on a set based around that band's Feeding of the 5000 album, which was performed in November 2007 in London at Shepherd's Bush Empire. In 2009 they decided to expand the show and tour worldwide, calling the tour The Last Supper. They announced their final show of this tour in London in 2011. Butt filled in on guitar for Love Amongst Ruin for two dates on the Recycling Party Tour in France in May 2011.

In 2012, Butt reformed the English Dogs to tour the US, with the band's earlier material.

In 2015, Butt joined the German alternative metal band Pyogenesis. He appeared on their most recent albums "A Century in the Curse of Time" and "A Kingdom to Disappear". He left the band in June 2018.

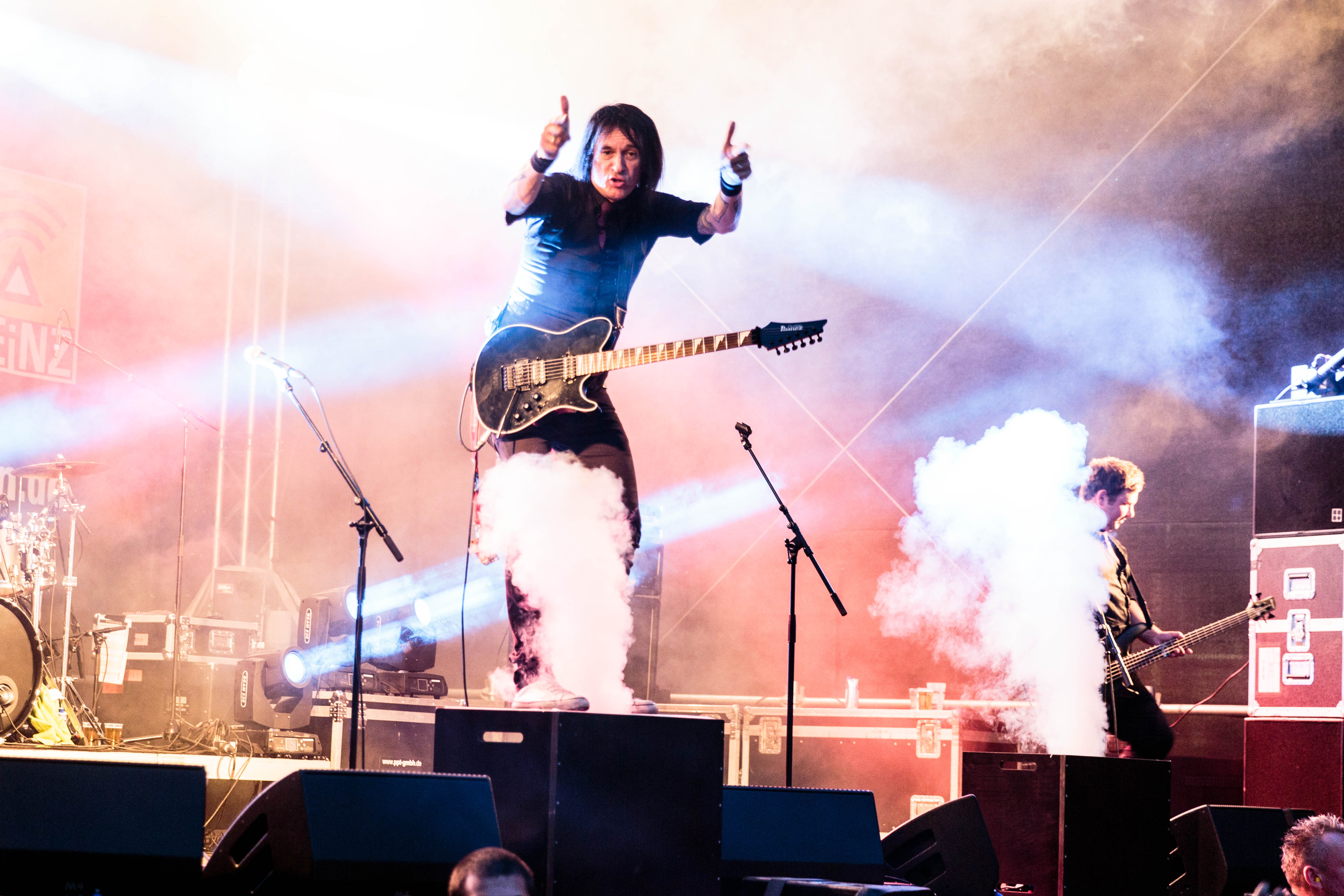
Butt with Pyogenesis in 2016

Butt has been cited for his guitar skills. "I started collecting Beatles records from when I was 9 so George Harrison would have been the first influence but my brother Chris was a player and a massive heavy rock fan. There was always a guitar hanging around the house. Chris introduced me to the Lynyrd Skynyrd album "Pronounced Le-nerd Skin-nerd" and a Jimi Hendrix live at Woodstock bootleg he'd picked up and I was gobsmacked. I wanted to play like that!". "It's a tough decision to make but Randy (Rhodes) may be my favourite all time player. He's certainly up there."

== Personal life ==
Outside of performance work, Butt teaches, formerly at Stamford School, now at Hampton College Peterborough and also currently at the Ormiston Academy in Peterborough.

== Discography ==
The Destructors

- EP – "Senseless Violence EP" (1982) Paperback (#33)
- EP – "Religion... There Is No Religion EP" (1982) Carnage Benelux (#34)
- EP – "Jailbait EP" (1982) Illuminated
- LP – "Exercise the Demons of Youth" (1982) Illuminated (#12)
- EP – "Forces of Law EP" (1983) Illuminated (#26)
- LP – "Armageddon in Action" (live) (1983) Radical Change (#10)
- EP – "Cry Havoc and Unleash The Dogs EP" (1983) Criminal Damage (#31)
- LP – "Merry Christmas and Fuck Off" (1983) Death Records
- EP – "Wild Thing", 4-track EP released December 1983, Illuminated Records, ILL1912
- EP – "Electronic Church" (1983) free with "Trees and Flowers" magazine
- LP – "Bomb Saigon, Bomb Hanoi, Bomb Disneyland" Album Released January 1984 Carnage Benelux, KILL666

Wardance

- UK Thrash Assault (Compilation containing "Officially Pronounced Dead" and "Against the Grain")

English Dogs

- Forward into Battle (Rot Records ASS20, 1985)
- Where Legend Began (Under One Flag Records FLAG4, 1987)
- Bow to None (Impact Records, 1994)
- All the World's a Rage (Impact Records, 1995)
- I've Got a Gun! Live in Helsinki (Retch Records, 1999)
- This Is Not a War (Retch Records, 2002)
- To the Ends of the Earth 12" (Rot Records, 1984)
- Metalmorphosis 12" (Under One Flag Records 12FLAG101, 1986)
- Sei was du bist (Impact 1995)
- What a Wonderful Feeling to Be F**ked by Everyone (Retch Records, 1995)
- The Thing with Two Heads (Earache Records, 2014)

The Prodigy

- Breathe (Xl Records, 2006, Gizz plays on the live version of Their Law – Live at Phoenix Festival 1996)
- The Fat of the Land (XL Records, 2007, there are samples of Gizz's playing on Fuel My Fire and a live photo of Gizz inside the cover)
- Their Law DVD (live DVD, includes footage from 1998 UK tour and 1997 Red Square gig, Gizz is on these)

The More I See

- The Wolves Are Hungry (SPV 2005)
- The Unholy Feast (Transcend 2007)
- Tread the Darker Path (Transcend 2010)
- The Disappearing Humans (Earache 2013)

Janus Stark

- Dynamo EP (1998, Earache Records)
- Great Adventure Cigar (1998, Earache Records)
- Every Little Thing Counts EP (1999, Earache Records)
- Clique EP (1999 Earache)
- Whatever Happened to Harold Smith soundtrack – (2000, East West Records)
- Angel in the Flames (2019, Time & Matter Records)
- Face Your Biggest Fear (2022, T&M Records)

Pyogenesis

- 2017: A Kingdom to Disappear (AFM Records)
- 2015: A Century in the Curse of Time (AFM Records)

The Desecrators

- Speed Up the Death Process (Pro Anti Records, 2010)

Sundance

- The Beyond Within (Looney Tunes Records, 1990)

Doom Day

- Count Your Useless Hours (Swell Creek Records SWSH 003, 2007)

Police Bastard

- Live in Frieberg
