= Pyogenesis =

German metal band

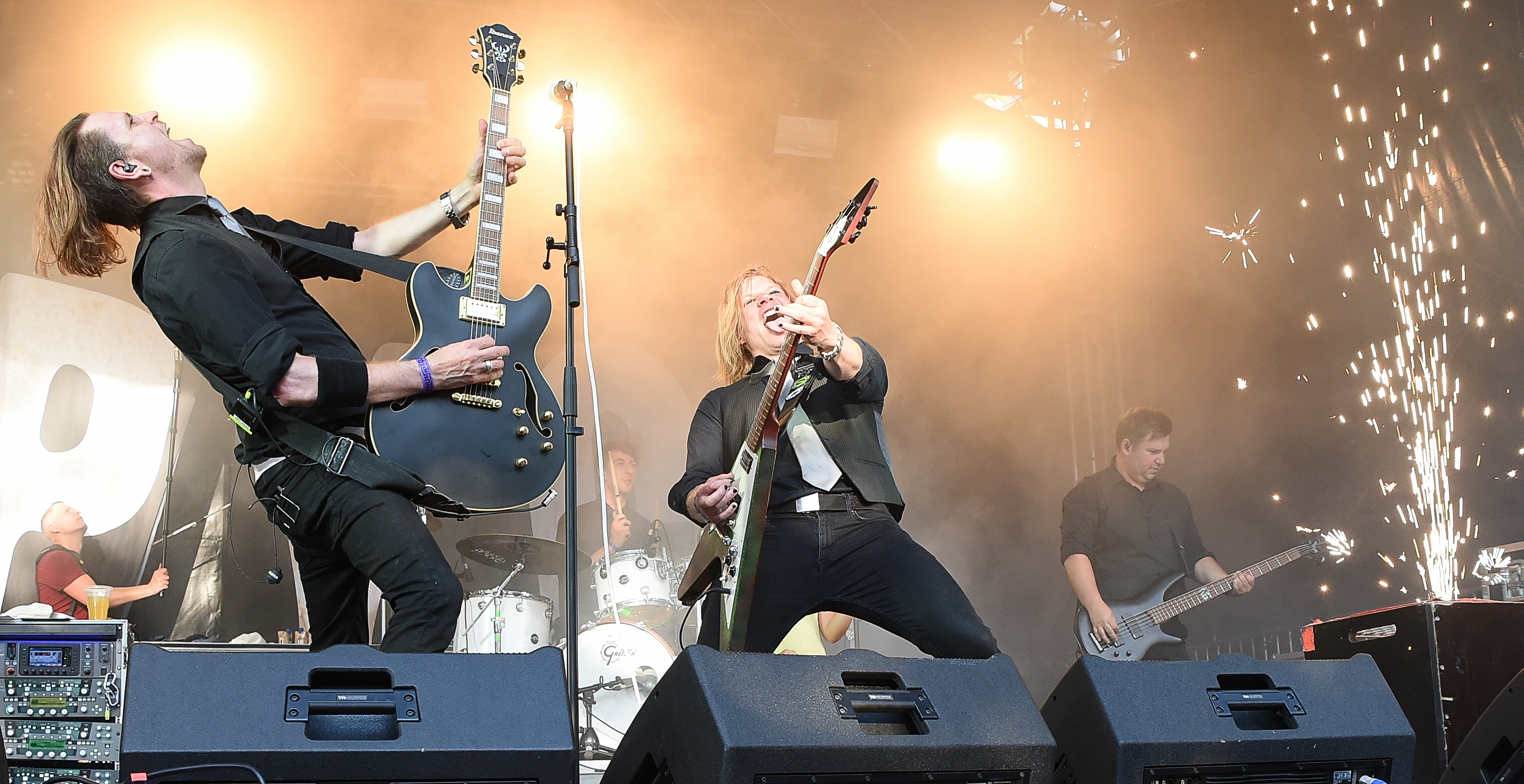
- Pyogenesis at Bochum Total 2023

Background information
- Origin: Stuttgart, Germany
- Genres: Alternative metal; gothic metal; death/doom; pop-punk (1990s–2000s)
- Years active: 1991–present
- Labels: Nuclear Blast, Hamburg, Osmose
- Members: Flo V. Schwarz; Malte Brauer; Gizz Butt; Sebastian Michalski
- Website: pyogenesis.com

Pyogenesis is a German band based in Stuttgart, formed in 1991. The band evolved musically from death and doom metal to gothic metal to alternative metal/rock and pop-punk, before later returning to a heavier style. They are considered a pioneering band in the gothic metal genre.

== History ==
=== Formation and early years ===
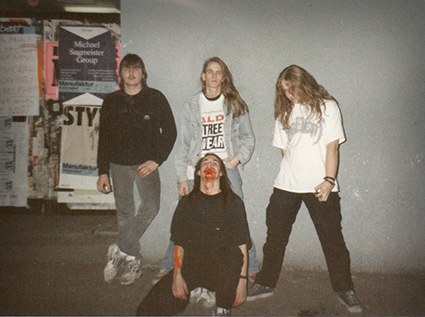
Pyogenesis' first band photo in 1991 (left to right: Pit, Flo, Tim; up front: Joe)

Pyogenesis originated from the local band Immortal Hate and singer/guitarist Flo V. Schwarz in mid-1991. The band members met at Rockfabrik, a club in the wider area of Stuttgart that covered all rock and metal styles. The owners gave the fledgling grindcore and death metal scene a place. At that time, numerous bands of the genre were found there, with some of them becoming big. Pyogenesis released their first 7" single "Rise of the Unholy" on the Mexican label Mephitic Productions. The recordings were previously released as the band's first demo tape. A short time later, the second single, "Sacrificious Profanity", with new recordings, was released on Symphonies of Death Records from Colombia. Of both singles, only 1,000 each were available and due to the band's deep entanglement in the underground scene, these first issues were sold out just within weeks. Due to its success, there were re-releases, which were marked as such.

=== 1992: Ignis Creatio ===
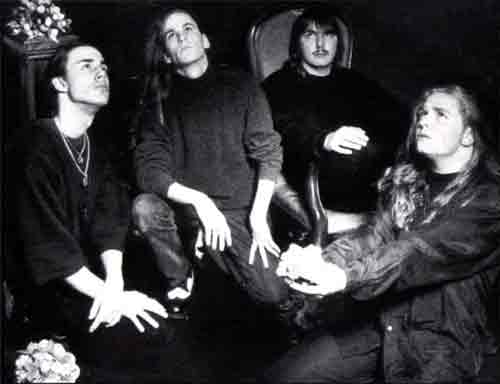
Pyogenesis at the time of the emerging gothic metal movement

In just five days, late September and early October 1992, the debut album Ignis Creatio, to be released on the French label Osmose Productions, was recorded and mixed. Containing four songs plus an outro and a total playing time of just 31 minutes it was a mini EP; nevertheless it was marketed and sold to the same price as a full-length album. The development of the music included both clear and guttural vocals for the first time. It was released on 12-inch vinyl and CD in Europe and from 1993 on also on tape in America.

=== 1993–1995: Sweet X-Rated Nothings and Waves of Erotasia ===
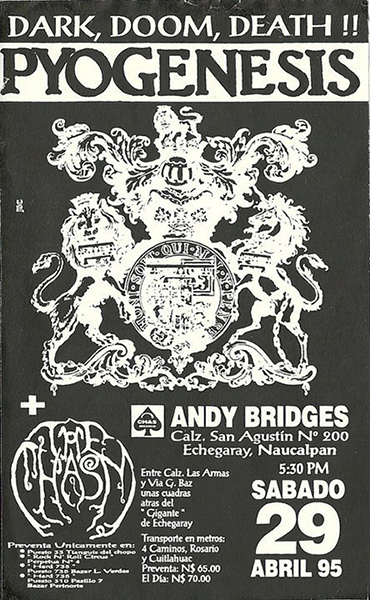
Tour poster for the band's first show in Mexico City, and the band's logo the Order of the Garters

In late 1993, the band recorded the album Sweet X-Rated Nothings, which Nuclear Blast was quite interested in. Both record companies were able to agree on a switch and Pyogenesis signed with Nuclear Blast. But the first joint release was the mini EP Waves of Erotasia with its total playing time of 15 Minutes, which came out in February 1994 on cassette and CD in North America and Europe. Both mini EP releases include the Order of the Garter's crest with its banderole "Honi soit qui mal y pense".

The band's first co-headlining tour with British Anathema and the Finnish support God Forsaken through Europe happened in January 1994. In November, the first full-length album Sweet X-Rated Nothings was released. Nuclear Blast changed its distribution structure so this was one of the first releases on the label that was not distributed through SPV but Warner Music in the German-speaking territories. The band's trademark, the clean vocals, came more and more to the fore. They played bigger events such as a concert for the German music television VIVA TV at the music trade fare Popkomm, before they, in March 1995, completed a two-week tour through the former Eastern Bloc, among others in countries such as the back-then newly-founded Czech Republic. German magazine Rock Hard had a journalist on this tour and released a four-page article about it.

In April 1995, the band played in Mexico for the first time, where they already made up a reputation by entering the national import charts at number 1. On the show, fans were jumping of a 5-metre (16 ft) gallery onto the audience, so the band had to interrupt the show, but continued after the situation was clear.

=== 1995: Twinaleblood ===
Despite numerous open-air shows – among others the Wacken Open Air, the world's biggest metal-fest – they recorded in the band's own studio the follow-up album Twinaleblood. The recordings were mixed at the Impulse Studios, Hamburg and mastered at the famous Home Studios, where they met Rammstein for the first time, who were busy with taping their first record.

Before the release of record, Pyogenesis travelled to Berlin to record the song "Son of Fate" with Harris Johns exclusively for the Death Is Just the Beginning… compilation and switched to the major label Warner Music. On 1 December, Twinaleblood was finally released, also available as digipak and gatefold-vinyl that became collector's items, to be seen on eBay for premium prices.

The album received positive reviews, being placed at No. 2 in Rock Hard magazine, which called it "one of the most varying and entertaining records of the year!". Along with the release, the band was touring three-and-a-half months through all relevant countries in Europe, followed by a festival tour and some headliner club shows. Both singles "Twinaleblood" and "Addiction Pole" had video clips that were shot in the mountains of Luxembourg and around Trier and got airplay on MTV.

=== 1996–1997: Unpop ===
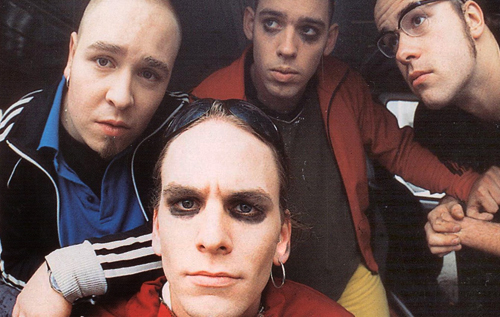
Pyogenesis in 1996 at the music video set of "Love Nation Sugarhead"

Immediately, the band started to work on Twinaleblood's follow-up album. A serious touch of alternative-music could be found in these 19 recordings that were produced in February 1996 in the band's own studio. The material was used for two different releases. The first one, the Love Nation Sugarhead mini-EP, came in October 1996 and had six songs, of which four were not released on the album. The title track's video clip gained serious interest in all relevant music TV channels. Due to its success, a remix for the American market was made by DJs King Britt and Josh Wink, who had previously worked with Depeche Mode or Moby. Flo V. Schwarz was flown in to Philadelphia to re-record the vocals for it at the end of the year. The remix was released as a 12" maxi and became a collector's item.

To gain interest on the forthcoming album, Pyogenesis played a tour with Social Distortion in late 1996 and released Unpop in January 1997. VIVA TV had them perform two songs live every day for a whole week. The front cover, which showed lead singer Flo V. Schwarz naked with a guitar in front of his private parts, had to be changed for the American market.

Among numerous club shows and festivals, the highlights of the following summer was an open-air concert in Hungary with an audience of more than 560,000 and the German Rheinkultur with 120,000 visitors. At the latter, singer Flo V. Schwarz encouraged the audience to throw drenched soil to the stage after it had rained for two full days, which led to an interruption of the event and the festival promoter filed a charge of mass-vandalism and wanted 50,000 Deutschmark for the crop damage. The newspaper Bonner Rundschau stated: "From Rhein-culture to mud-culture".

=== 1998: Mono... or Will It Ever Be the Way It Used to Be ===
During 1998, Pyogenesis started to work on their fourth full-length album, which was produced at Woodhouse Studios by Siggi Bemm. The band only halted the recordings for the twin festivals Rock am Ring and Rock im Park, where they headlined the NTF stage and a concert at the Bizarre Festival. In November, Mono ... or Will It Ever Be the Way It Used to Be was released and given best marks by the press, such as Visions magazine who put them on number 2 of the editors charts and wrote about it: "It's the sunshine, the first kiss, the butterflies in your stomach, just beautiful. And the best about it, this record will remain!" The video clip "Drive Me Down" also received worldwide airplay. Tim Eiermann and Wolfgang Maier left Pyogenesis after they had joined the project Liquido earlier this year, with which they achieved higher chart positions.

=== 1999–2002: Touring and P... or Different Songs in Different Sounds ===
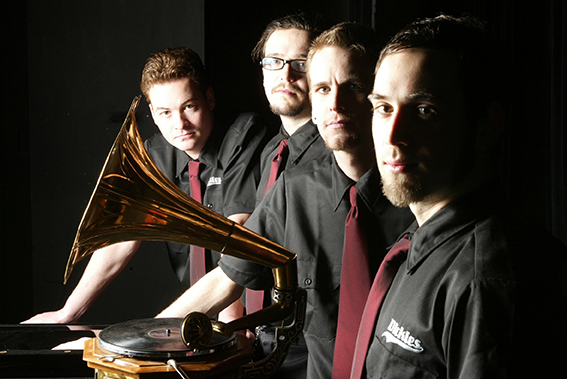
Pyogenesis in 2002

Pyogenesis were touring relentlessly the next three-and-a-half years through all Europe with up to 140 tour dates a year. In some countries, they played for the very first time, such as Liechtenstein or Bulgaria, where they headlined a festival in the city center of Sofia with more than 25,000 attendees. A lot of footage of these touring years can be seen on the home video the band released in the summer of 2000. Pyogenesis started a three-day fan-travel along with the release of the home video, where 50 dedicated fans and the band members were driving in a coach from spot to spot, such as a visit of the editorial office of the Visions magazine, a concert in an abandoned mining pit, or the recording of a TV show with the band.

Nuclear Blast wanted to release a best-of album, which did not meet the band's perception, so both parties agreed on a remix album titled P ... or Different Songs in Different Sounds, which was released in July 2000. Billboard magazin, publisher of the U.S. record sales charts, did not consider the album as a regular remix album as the band themselves also re-recorded a few tracks. From 1999 on, Pyogenesis were working on 28 new songs, which were recorded in the summer of 2001, again at the Woodhouse Studios, produced by Flo V. Schwarz and Siggi Bemm. Fans were allowed to listen to some song snippets and vote in order to affect the track listing of the record.

=== 2002: She Makes Me Wish I Had a Gun and I Feel Sexy ===
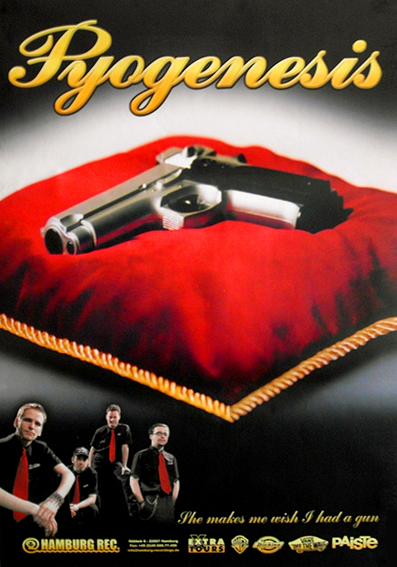
Tour poster for She Makes Me Wish I Had a Gun

In 2002, Flo V. Schwarz founded the label Hamburg Records. He had been working at Nuclear Blast for many years and achieved the expertise needed for such an undertaking. In May 2002, the five-track EP I Feel Sexy was released, followed by the full-length album She Makes Me Wish I Had a Gun in June. Despite the change of music, the records were released positively. Rock Hard wrote: "I am excited about every single song of the record and believe that this 5th Pyogenesis record is the best by far! Congratulations!" The album was the band's best-selling one so far.

After a suicide attack in a school in Thuringia, the band was not allowed to put their tour posters in public places that showed the cover of the record, a gun lying on a red velvet pillow. The video clip of their single "Don't You Say Maybe" entered and stayed on the pole position of the viewer charts, leaving bands as Donots, Beatsteaks or Manowar behind them.

=== 2003–2015 ===
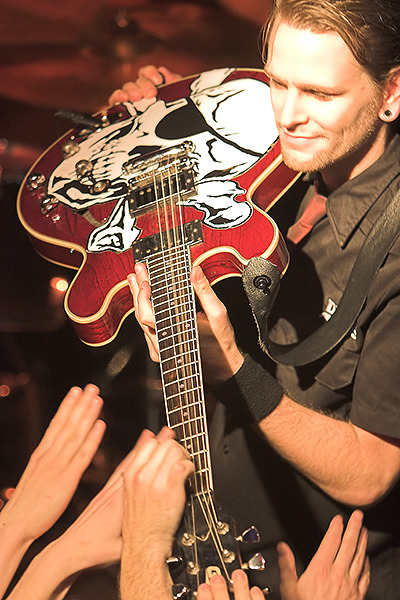
Flo V. Schwarz live in Moscow

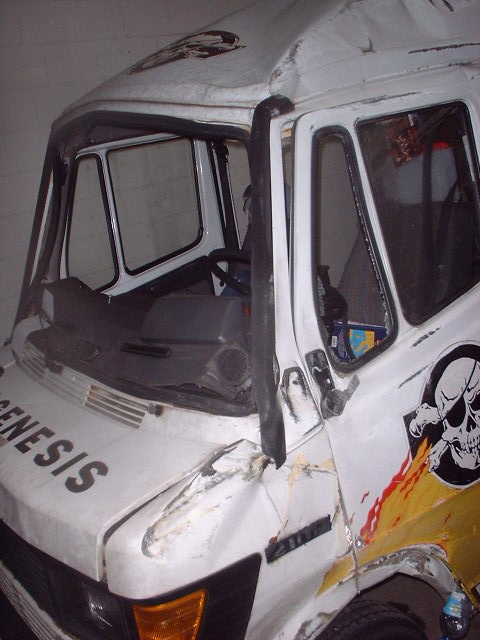
Tour bus after the crash

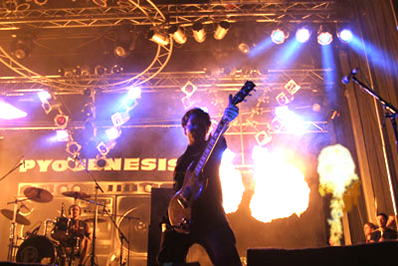
Pyro show at Summer Breeze festival

In the next years, the band played several tours through Europe such as Germany, Benelux, former Soviet Union states and Italy, where a fan entered the scene and was dragged to the ground by the security guards. On the way back from a festival, a tire of the band bus blew, and the vehicle went head-over-wheels twice. There was just minor injury, even if members of the band and crew were sleeping at the time.

In 2003, Pyogenesis played a co-headliner at the Summer Breeze Open Air. They used a lot of pyrotechnics such as up to 12-meter-high flame towers, wherefore the fire service had to implement aluminum sheets below the roof of the stage. From 2005 on, the band exclusively played outside their homeland Germany. They went to Russia a couple of times, where they also played the very last shows in the capital Moscow and the Asian part of the country at the Russian leg of the Snowboard World Championship as the headliner in front of 25,000 people, before their concert break until 2014.

By the end of 2012, the band announced the re-release of their first mini EP accordingly to the 20th anniversary of this record. The whole issue was sold out within just 10 days.

The work of Wolfgang Maier and Tim Eiermann with Liquido ended by their split-up in 2009. Flo V. Schwarz is still running his company Hamburg Records, working with a variety of bands.

=== 2015–2020: The Steampunk Trilogy ===
The band activities restarted with a comeback show in Bucharest, Romania, where they played a sold-out show in front of 1,000 fans. Jan Räthje on drums and British guitarist Gizz Butt (best known for being in The Prodigy) on lead guitar joined the band, and a trilogy of albums about the change of the society in the 19th century was released between 2015 and 2020: A Century in the Curse of Time, A Kingdom to Disappear and A Silent Soul Screams Loud, known as the "Steampunk Trilogy". In that period, Pyogenesis also issued video clips in steampunk aesthetics and toured the world.

== Musical style ==
Pyogenesis started out as a death metal band and later became one of the leading figures in death/doom and gothic metal during the 1990s. Starting with their fourth album Unpop in 1997, the band took a significant turn in their music, becoming an alternative rock and pop-punk band. They maintained this style until She Makes Me Wish I Had a Gun (2002). After several years, Pyogenesis returned with A Century in the Curse of Time in 2015, presenting an experimental sound with elements ranging from alternative rock and metal to gothic metal, doom metal, and death metal.

== Discography ==
=== Studio albums ===
- 1992: Ignis Creatio / aka Pyogenesis (Osmose Productions / SPV)
- 1994: Sweet X-Rated Nothings (Nuclear Blast / Warner Music)
- 1995: Twinaleblood ( Warner Music / Nuclear Blast)
- 1997: Unpop (Nuclear Blast / Warner Music)
- 1998: Mono… or Will It Ever Be the Way It Used to Be (Nuclear Blast / Warner Music)
- 2002: She Makes Me Wish I Had a Gun (Hamburg Records / Sony Music)
- 2015: A Century in the Curse of Time (AFM Records)
- 2017: A Kingdom to Disappear (AFM Records)
- 2020: A Silent Soul Screams Loud (AFM Records)

=== EPs ===
- 1994: Waves of Erotasia (Nuclear Blast / SPV)
- 1996: Love Nation Sugarhead (Nuclear Blast / Warner Music)
- 2002: I Feel Sexy (Hamburg Records / Sony Music)
- 2026: Nothing but My Heart (Massacre Records)

=== Miscellaneous ===
- 1991 Ode to the Churning Seas of Nar-Mataru Demo Tape
- 2000 P... The Ultimate Home Video VHS/DVD (Nuclear Blast / Warner Music)
- 2000 P... or Different Songs in Different Sounds (Nuclear Blast / Warner Music)

== Chart positions ==
Year	Album	Position
2015	A Century in the Curse of Time	45
2017	A Kingdom to Disappear	76
2020	A Silent Soul Screams Loud	33
