= Simpson Township =

Simpson Township may refer to:

== Canada ==
- Simpson Township, a historic county in Algoma District, Ontario

== United States ==
- Simpson Township, Grant County, Arkansas
- Simpson Township, Johnson County, Missouri
- Simpson Township, Dewey County, Oklahoma
- Simpson Township, McIntosh County, Oklahoma

== See also ==
- Simpson (disambiguation)
