= The Now =

English punk rock group

- Origin: Peterborough, England
- Genres: Punk rock
- Years active: 1976–1979; 2005–present
- Labels: Ultimate Records, Raw Records, Last Years Youth, Damaged Goods
- Members: Michael McGuire; Steve Rolls; Joe MacColl; Faz Farrow
- Past members: Steve Quinney; Paul Wicks (aka Dangerous Dip / Mysterious Dip); Nigel Davis; Tommy Tomlinson
- Website: Official website

The Now are an English punk rock group from Peterborough, England. Whilst never officially disbanding, they ceased recording and performing in 1979. In 2004, The Now recorded all of their original material and released as the Fuzztone Fizzadelic album in 2005 on the Damaged Goods record label.

== Career ==
The Now, founded by Mike McGuire and Steve Rolls late in 1976, were Peterborough's first punk rock band. Mike and Steve were at the time performing with The Faderz, who had only existed for a few months, before they had hooked into the London Punk scene in 1976. Joe MacColl and Paul Wicks (aka The Dangerous Dip or occasionally The Mysterious Dip) were recruited immediately to form The Now. Early gigs were self organised affairs, notably at the Peterborough Marcus Garvey Club. A community club, mainly catering for the city's West Indian community. Such gigs were usually with local reggae artists such as The Legions, any punk band who would dare come out of London (or other major cities), such as 999, The Killjoys and Eater, as well as new local punk bands such as Heavy Manners. This was a great challenge for The Now since putting Punk Rock into an East Anglian provincial environment (where there already existed a time warp sensibility), caused a lot of friction at that time. During this time The Dangerous Dip was replaced on the bass guitar by Faz Farrow. The Now were managed by Allen Adams who later went on to form the band The Destructors and later Destructors 666.

The Now were distinguished from what is traditionally known as 123 'Punk' thrash. The Now were considered unique. The Now played many gigs, and could often be found playing those early, then famous, London venues such as Roxy Club and The Vortex clubs in London.

The Now released two singles "Development Corporations" / "Why" on Ultimate Records in November 1977 and a deal with Lee Wood's Raw Records signed in mid 1978 produced two songs, "Into The 80's" and "9 'O' Clock" (actually recorded for Raw in late 1977) which were re-mixed and scheduled for 23 March release. This 7" single was delayed due to economic problems which would soon force the Cambridge-based label to close down. When it eventually emerged on 30 November, only 800 copies were pressed, with at least half of these being destroyed in a fire at Raw's warehouse. Both singles were, in the main, well received. The first single, "Development Corporations", reached number 4 in the Sounds alternative chart and number 2 in the Time Out chart in 1977.

Around this time, The Now, went their own ways through mutual consent. In 2002 there was a great deal of interest around the original singles, particularly in Europe. As a result, a German record company, Last Years Youth, duly re-released both singles, containing a couple of previously unreleased versions of the original songs. It was a logical progression (albeit unusual) to use this exposure as an opportunity to record and release a definitive version of all of the early songs written by The Now. Fuzztone Fizzadelic was recorded during 2004 by the four original members of The Now, representing their original set list, as performed in 1977. In true punk rock style The Now rehearsed for three hours and had two days in the studio for recording and mixing. 27 years between writing and recording must be some sort of record. Fuzztone Fizzadelic was released in 2005.

Mike McGuire and Steve Rolls went on to form 80's avant garde band Sudden Sway. Joe MacColl went on to join mod revivalists The Name. Faz Farrow went on to perform with numerous band as a journeyman bass guitarist including Swindon based Mod/Soul/Powerpop bands 'The Suspicions' and 'Peloton'. Steve Rolls joined The Destructors by Allen Adams in 2006 to Present.

== Discography ==
=== Albums ===
- Fuzztone Fizzadelic (Damaged Goods, August 2005)

=== Singles ===
- "Development Corporations" / "Why?" (Ultimate Records, ULT401, 1977)
- "Development Corporations" / "Why?" (Ultimate Records, ULT401-A, 1977, Blue Vinyl)
- "9 O Clock" / "Into the 80's" (Raw Records, RAW31, 1978)
- "9 O Clock" / "Into the 80's" (Re-distributed under Last Years Youth Records (LAST 1, 2000) Limited Edition of 500
- "Development Corporations" / "Why" / "Development Corporations" (Live in the Studio Mix) (Last Years Youth, LAST 11, 2002) Limited Edition of 500
- "Into The 80's" / "9 O Clock" (Live in the Studio Mix) / "Into the 80's" (Live in the Studio Mix) (Last Years Youth, LAST 12, 2002) Limited Edition of 500

=== Compilations ===
- Here Come The Now CD. Japanese Release (Wizard in Vinyl, June 2005) – Best of Compilation (includes Singles + Live Sessions) Limited Edition 1000. 500 in Red Vinyl
- Here Come The Now LP. German Release (Last Years Youth, June 2005) – Best of Compilation (includes '79 Recordings)
- Oh No! It's More From Raw CD (2003)
- Don't You Know It's ...Last years Youth! CD. Japanese Release(Wizzard in Vinyl, WIV039, 2005) contains into The 80's. 9 O Clock and Development Corporations.
- Punk 45. There Is No Such Thing As Society. Get A Job, Get A Car, Get A Bed, Get Drunk! CD & Double Album Vinyl (Soul Jazz Records, 2014) Feat. Development Corporations.

== Reviews ==
- 'A primitive but wonderful single from a criminally underrated D.I.Y. Punk band from Peterborough. This sounds like the Desperate Bicycles, and is a very simple, but effective protest song about a subject that should be dear to your hearts. And fuzztone fizzedelic guitar! You need more?'
- "It sounds like the rough first cassette of two really good songs from a Peterborough punk band. Usual '77 cynicism, plus (skeleton) Sex Pistols style melodic strength. I like it. Try and hear it".
- 'Amateur to the point of severe embarrassment'
- 'Well-intentioned identipunk. For specialists only'
- 'Even though the sound is strictly garage production level, the songs too long, and the sleeve packaging amateurish in the most boring way, this is worth checking out. 'Why?' has an intro reminiscent of an old Velvet Underground tune (you decide which one), then bursts into one of the most anguished, bewildered cries at life's futility I've ever heard'

== See also ==
- List of 1970s punk rock musicians
