= The Wernt =

British hardcore punk band

- Origin: Birmingham, England; Grantham, England
- Genres: Hardcore punk
- Years active: 1997–1998
- Labels: Knock Out Records; Data Records
- Members: Pete "Wakey" Wakefield; Ross Lomas; Colin "Jock" Blyth
- Past members: Andrew "Pinch" Pinching

The Wernt were a side project set up by members of British hardcore punk bands Charged GBH and English Dogs in 1997.

== History ==
In July 1997, GBH members Colin "Jock" Blyth (guitar) and Ross Lomas (bass/guitar) and English Dogs members Pete "Wakey" Wakefield (vocals) and Andrew "Pinch" Pinching (drums) recorded and mixed the album Wreckin Temples in nine days at Jigsaw Studio in Frognall. All music that appeared on the album was originally written in 1980 and 1981 by GBH and English Dogs but was never recorded.

In 1998, they released the EP Barking Spider and in 2004 Wreckin Temples was supposed to be released in the United States on Beer City Records but it came to nothing.

== Discography ==
=== Albums ===
- Wreckin Temples (Knock Out Records, 1997)

=== Singles and EPs ===
- Barking Spider (Data Records, 1998)

=== Compilation albums ===
- Knock-Out... in the 3rd Round (Knock Out Records, 1998)
- [Counter Attack] (Beer City Records, 2003)
