= Simpson's Tavern =

Pub in the City of London

Coordinates: 51.513046°N 0.0859718°W

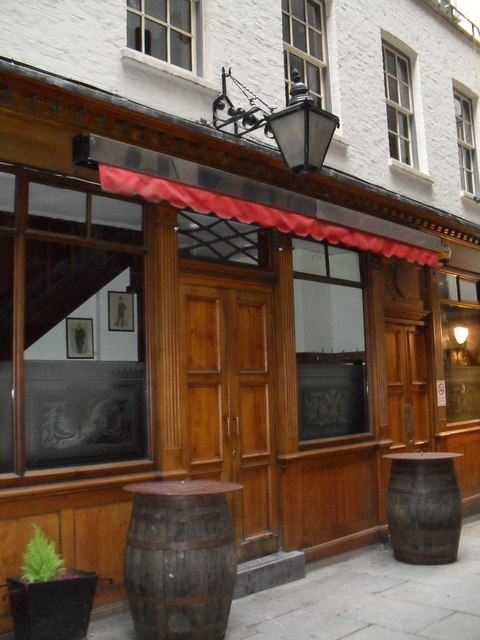
Simpson's Tavern, London

Simpson's Tavern was a pub and restaurant at 38 1/2, Ball Court Alley, Cornhill, in the City of London, EC3.

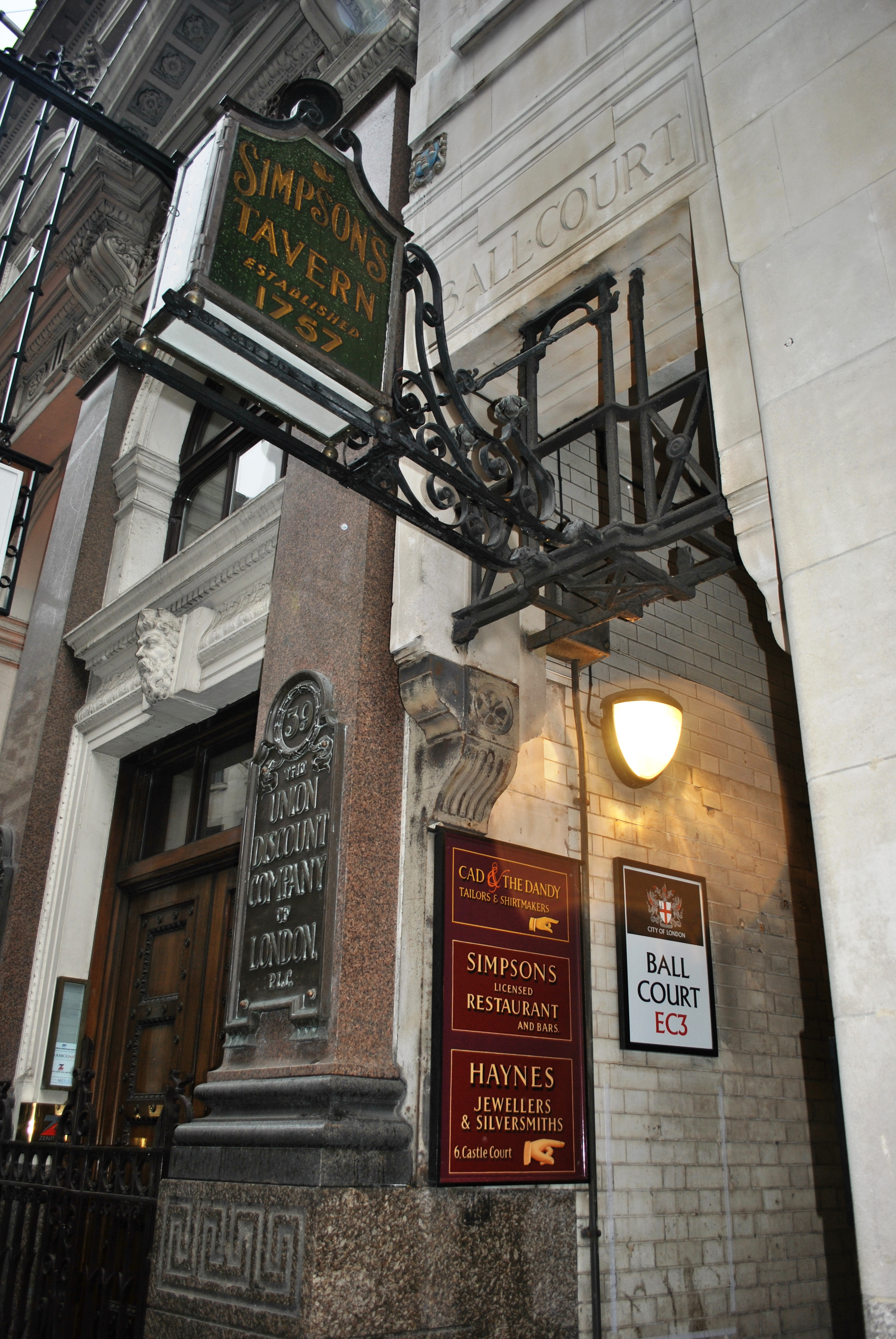
Simpson's Tavern's sign at the entrance of Ball Court

Simpson's occupied a Grade II listed building, built in the late 17th and early 18th centuries.

Simpson's Tavern was closed down by the owner of the building on 28 October 2022, following a dispute about rental payments.

== Image records ==
1812

Record No: 1219 Catalogue No: v9045926 Description: St Margaret Lothbury (Deposited Collection). Elevation of house in Bird in Hand Court, Cheapside, belonging to the parishes of St Mary Colechurch, London and St Mary, Battersea. Section: London Metropolitan Archives.

Record No: 1220 Catalogue No: v9045932 Description: St Margaret Lothbury (Deposited Collection). Plan of estate in Bird in Hand Court, Cheapside, belonging to the parishes of St Mary Colechurch, London and St Mary, Battersea. Section: London Metropolitan Archives.

1819

Record No: 1221, Catalogue No: q2318143 Description: St Margaret Lothbury (Deposited Collection). Elevation of no. 3 Bird in Hand Court, Cheapside., Cheapside, belonging to the parishes of St Mary Colechurch, London and St Mary, Battersea. Section: London Metropolitan Archives.

Record No: 1222, Catalogue No: q231815x, Description: Elevation of house in Bird in Hand Court, Cheapside, Section: London Metropolitan Archives.

1836

Record No: 4800 Catalogue No: q6889411 Title London Bridge (new) Description View of the entrance to London Bridge from Southwark showing London Bridge Tavern and the shop fronts of Benjamin Edgington and Paine and Simpson. Also showing a street scene with horse-drawn vehicles. Section: London Metropolitan Archives Artist Yates, G. (1777 - 1838) Medium: watercolour.

1941

Record No: 38648 Catalogue No: SC_PHL_01_005_88_311 Description: Front elevation of Simpson's public house (formerly Simpsons Tavern), 4 Castle Court, City of London, with windows and lamp visible. An open basement window for barrels and goods can also be seen. The passage is included in the Heritage Walk around the City as an example of a city tavern. Section: London Metropolitan Archives

Record No: 38654 Catalogue No SC_PHL_01_005_F541 Description: Front elevation of Simpson's public house (formerly Simpson's Tavern), 4 Castle Court, City of London. The passage is included in the Heritage Walk around the City as an example of a city tavern. Section: London Metropolitan Archives

1953

Record No: 36036 Catalogue No: m0028667cl, Description: View of Bird in Hand Court, Date of execution: 1953, Section London Metropolitan Archives, Artist Willis, James D, Medium photograph.

1970

Record No: 38814 Catalogue No SC_PHL_01_007_70_54 Description:39 Cornhill, City of London: north facing front elevation. Four-storeys visible, each with five windows. Ground floor: five windows each with glass lunette; six pilasters supporting two classical style pediments at each end; flagpole fixed above both pediments. First floor: six pilasters supporting small parapet in classical style; five pedimented sash windows, balustrades upon the central three. Second floor: six pilasters supporting classical style parapet; flagpole fixed in front of central window. Bottom right: doorway with partially extended metal shutter; signs either side mark building number and premises of "The Union Discount Company of London Limited."; Alley to Ball Court leading to Simpson's Tavern (est. 1757) partially visible. Number 39 Cornhill was Grade II listed in 1970, list entry number: 1064710 list entry number: 1191985. Section: London Metropolitan Archives

1971

Record No 38841 Catalogue No: SC_PHL_01_007_71_2057 Title Interior of an office building in Cornhill Description 39 Cornhill, City of London: ground-floor office. Large windows with partial frosted glass section; sign form Simpson's Tavern partially visible through top left corner; ceiling candelabra; painting mounted on back wall, subject and artist unknown; marble fireplace with carriage clock and dark wood mirror; leather sofa and chairs; dark wood desk with lamp and paperweights. Number 39 Cornhill was Grade II listed in 1970, list entry number: 1064710. Simpson's Tavern was Grade II listed in 1970, list entry number: 1191985.

== Books & News ==
Books & News articles that mention or describe Simpsons Tavern and Simpsons Fish Ordinaries:

- William Makepeace Thackeray; a biography including hitherto uncollected letters & speeches & a bibliography of 1300 items by Melville, Lewis, 1874-1932 Publication date 1910 page 82
- The uncollected writings of Charles Dickens: Household Words, 1850-1859; by Dickens, Charles, 1812-1870 page 120-122 and 709
- Household Words. A Weekly Journal. Conducted by Charles Dickens 1856-10-11: Vol 14 Issue 342 page 300
- Thackeray in the United States, 1852-3, 1855-6, including a record of a variety of Thackerayana. Bibliography by Frederick S. Dickson by Wilson, James Grant, 1832-1914; Dickson, Frederick Stoever, 1850-1925 page 176
- So You're Going To England by Clara E. Laughlin page 400
- Notes and Queries 27/9/1913 Vol 8 Issue 196 page 256
- The Nation and Athenaeum 28/05/1921 Vol 29 Issue 9 Page 320
- The Ghosts of London by H. V. Morton pages 54 – 59
- In search of London by H. V. Morton (1892-1979) pages 34 & 349
- The Kiwanis Magazine 1924-01: Vol 9 Issue 1
- Harper's New Monthly Magazine 1870-07: Vol 41 Issue 242 page 264
- The Examiner and London Review 1870-05-07: Issue 3249 Page 4
- The Albion 1856-11-08: Vol 15 Issue 45
- The Shell book of firsts by Robertson, Patrick, 1940 page 156
- Plant doctoring is fun by Westcott, Cynthia, 1898 page 30
- The Christian Science Monitor 1954-10-23: Vol 46 Issue 279 page 18
- The Christian Science Monitor 1940-03-23: Vol 32 Issue 99 page 30
- The new shell book of firsts by Robertson, Patrick; Robertson, Patrick. Shell book of firsts page 342
- A new book about London; a quaint and curious volume of forgotten lore by Wagner, Leopold, 1858 page 10
- Meat three times a day by Schlink, F. J. (Frederick John), 1891-1995 page 42
- A journey due North; being notes of a residence in Russia by Sala, George Augustus, 1828-1895 page 42
- The journals of Arnold Bennett by Bennett, Arnold, 1867-1931 page 288, 291, 207
- The field Publication date 1853, page 152, 200, 224, 264, 284, 408, 432, 456.
- The English inn by Burke, Thomas, 1886-1945 page 136
- The Best of All Good Company by Blanchard Jerrold page 187
- The social history of smoking by Apperson, George Latimer, 1857-1937. n 50023502
- Agnes Scott Alumnae Quarterly [1939-1940] by Agnes Scott College page 38
- The Journals Of Anrnold Bennett by Newmas Flower page 298
- Independent 31 May 1996, Ireland, English: Industrial trawling empties the ocean
