= I, James Blunt =

Book by Henry Vollam Morton

- Author: H. V. Morton
- Language: English
- Genre: Propaganda, future history
- Publisher: Methuen
- Publication date: 16 June 1942
- Publication place: United Kingdom
- Media type: Print (hardback & paperback)
- Pages: 56 pp

I, James Blunt is a 1942 wartime future history short-story by English journalist H. V. Morton. It takes the form of a diary written by an English tradesman chronicling the Nazi occupation of Great Britain in the autumn of 1944. The short-story was commissioned by the Ministry of Information as propaganda. It is Morton's only work of fiction besides his travel journalism writings, for which he is better known. George Orwell described the short story as "a good flesh creeper, founded on the justified assumption that the mass of the English people haven't heard of fascism."

== Plot summary ==
The short story chronicles the occupation of the United Kingdom by the Nazis from 11 September 1944 to 13 March 1945 who begin a programme of "complete Germanisation" of the country. St Paul's Cathedral is razed to make room for a Nazi Party headquarters and guerrilla warfare and any potential dissidence is suppressed through heavy policing.
