= Fuzztone Fizzadelic =

Studio album by The Now
- Released: 29 August 2005
- Recorded: 2002–2005
- Studios: The Lodge Recording Studio, Northampton
- Genre: Punk
- Length: 42:35
- Label: Damaged Goods
- Producer: The Now

Fuzztone Fizzadelic is the debut album by The Now, released by Damaged Goods. The album was recorded over 2 short days at The Lodge Recording Studio in Northampton between 2002 and 2005. All recorded tracks reflected the bands setlist at the start of 1977 and were recorded almost live in the studio. All songs were written and recorded by The Now and performed by the original members, Mike McGuire, Steve Rolls, Joe MacColl and Faz Farrow

== Track listing ==
1. Why
2. Development Corporations
3. Labour Party
4. Here It Comes Now
5. Third World War
6. You Student
7. 9 O Clock
8. Into the 80's
9. In The Earth
10. The Invaders
11. Womans Own
12. DC77
13. Here It Comes Now (Dub)

== Personnel ==
- Mike McGuire : Vocals
- Steve Rolls : Guitars
- Joe MacColl : Drums
- Faz Farrow : Bass

== Title and cover ==
The title of the album, Fuzztone Fizzadelic, comes from a review of The first single by The Now called Development Corporations / Why? (Ultimate Records, ULT401, 1977), in Sounds (music paper available in '77) written by Jon Savage. The review simply said:

A primitive but wonderful single from a criminally underrated D.I.Y. Punk band from Peterborough. This sounds like the Desperate Bicycles, and is a very simple, but effective protest song about a subject that should be dear to your hearts. And fuzztone fizzedelic guitar! You need more?

The cover photo was taken early in 1977, somewhere in the New England area of Peterborough. The people shown are (from right to left):

- Steve Rolls (The Now)
- Faz Farrow (The Now)
- Pete Chambers (Friend of The Now. Pete almost became the bass player of The Now but he changed his mind).
- Allen Adams (Manager of The Now)
- Mike McGure (The Now)
- Paul Wicks (ex The Now)
- Joe MacColl (The Now)
- Debbie Cutbill (Girlfriend of Joe)
- Gina (Friend of The Now)
- Mary (Friend of The Now. Gina's Sister)

It was photographed by Debbie Weiss (Girlfriend of Steve, with Pete's camera)
