= Simpson Creek (Missouri) =

Stream in the American state of Missouri

Coordinates: 36.651447°N 90.849012°W

Simpson Creek is a stream in Ripley County in the U.S. state of Missouri. It is a tributary of the Current River.

Simpson Creek has the name of Peter Simpson, a pioneer citizen.

== See also ==
- List of rivers of Missouri
