= Swinson =

Swinson is a surname. Notable people with the surname include:

- Aaron Swinson (born 1971), American basketball player
- Arthur Swinson (c. 1915–1970), British Army officer
- Bradyn Swinson (born 2003), American football player
- Corey J. Swinson (1969–2013, American football player
- David Swinson Maynard (1808–1873), American pioneer
- Jo Swinson (born 1980), Scottish politician
- Maggie Swinson, English accountant and Anglican lay leader
- Tim Swinson (born 1987), English rugby union footballer

== See also ==
- Charlene Thomas-Swinson (born 1965), American basketball coach
