= Janus Stark (band) =

British punk band

- Origin: Peterborough, England
- Genres: Punk rock
- Years active: 1997–2002; 2018–present
- Labels: Time & Matter Recordings, Earache Records, Trauma Records

Janus Stark are an English experimental punk rock band from Peterborough, England. Their album, Great Adventure Cigar, was highly rated by Foo Fighters and Die Toten Hosen (Vom Richie asked the band to support for the Die Toten Hosen Live tour 2000 and Campino would introduce and praise the band before each performance) and was a fusion of Punk rock, hard rock, heavy metal and alternative with influences from Helmet to The Ruts to The Beatles to The Clash. Formed by former English Dogs/UK Subs guitarist Gizz Butt, Janus Stark released their album Great Adventure Cigar in 1998 on Earache Records. Butt was also playing guitar for The Prodigy while they were touring on the back of Fat Of The Land. Their name comes from a character, Janus Stark, in the seventies comic books Smash and Valiant. They are also known for Butt's guitar playing. Ben Hughes commented on RPM online "The thing that sets Janus Stark apart from their contemporaries is the fact that Gizz is a shredder. While ‘Angel In The Flames’ is littered with turn of the Century pop punk sensibilities, buzzsaw guitars and full band harmonies, there is a more technical and aggressive element in place thanks to Gizz's guitar histrionics. Yet, while the lyrics are socially and politically aware, and the riffs crunchy, it's the melodies that always shine through, they are pure sugar for the soul."

Their song "Every Little Thing Counts" was featured on the soundtracks to the 1998 films Disturbing Behavior and Varsity Blues.

The band split up in 2002, but Gizz Butt reformed the band in 2018. He had meanwhile put together a harder, thrashier act, The More I See. Gizz Butt decided to reform Janus Stark, roping in Richard Gombault of 1990s pop-punk band Midget and friends Fozzy Dixon and Simon Martin. The reunion gig was the Hamburg Punk festival Booze Cruise.

In September 2018, they released a new song and video "Shuffling The Pack", the first of four songs which was written for the upcoming new album with the working title of 'Angel In The Flames'. In 2019, Janus Stark continued and completed recording for the second album and played at The Camden Monarch, The Manchester Punk Festival, The 100 Club, The Camden Rocks Festival, Unity Fest and The Hard Drive Fest before supporting The Wildhearts. They were set to release their latest album, Angel In The Flames on 15 November 2019 via Time & Matter Records.

== Original line-up ==
In 1998, the band's line-up was as follows:

- Gizz Butt (vocals/guitars)
- Andy 'Pinch' Pinching (drums)
- Shop (bass)

== Current line-up ==
As of 2026, the band consists of:

- Gizz Butt
- David Pistolas (rhythm guitar / backing vocals)
- Richard 'Angus' Mackman (bass)
- Scott Bickers (drums)

== Discography ==
- Dynamo EP (1998, Earache Records)
- Great Adventure Cigar (1998, Earache Records/Trauma Records)
- Every Little Thing Counts EP (1999, Earache Records)
- Janus Stark (Self titled EP) (2002)
- Angel In The Flames (T&M Records) (2019)
- Face Your Biggest Fear (T&M Records) (2022)

== Reviews ==
- '"Every Little Thing Counts" takes the irresistible blueprint of The Beatles, kicks it into the present with lashings of Punk Rock swagger, and slams a bastard great Heavy Metal cherry on the top. In short - stark raving brilliant'.
