= Simpson Branch (Loutre River tributary) =

Stream in the American state of Missouri

Coordinates: 38.873375°N 91.585444°W

Simpson Branch is a stream in Montgomery County in the U.S. state of Missouri. It is a tributary of Loutre River.

Simpson Branch has the name of a pioneer citizen.

== See also ==
- List of rivers of Missouri
