= Simson =

Simson may refer to:

- Simson (name)
- Simson (artist) Music Producer based out of Milwaukee, Wisconsin.
- Simson (company), a German company that produced firearms, automobiles, motorcycles, and mopeds
- Simson line in geometry, named for Robert Simson
- Simson Provincial Park in Canada
- KSV Simson Bremen, German football club

== See also ==
- Samson (disambiguation)
- Simpson (disambiguation)
