= Simpson test =

- Purpose: determine ocular myasthenia gravis

Simpson test is a clinical test used in neurology to determine ocular myasthenia gravis. It was first described by the Scottish neurologist John Alexander Simpson.

The Simpson test is sometimes incorrectly referred to as the "Jolly test". However, the Jolly test an electrophysiological repetitive nerve stimulation test, which is also used in diagnosis of myasthenia gravis.

== Procedure ==
In myasthenia gravis, there is a variable weakness of skeletal muscles, which is exacerbated by repeated contraction. To cause sustained contraction of levator palpebrae superioris muscle, the patient is asked to gaze upward for an extended period of time, without lifting the head. After a few minutes, the patient with myasthenia gravis starts to show drooping of upper eyelids, while normal individuals do not show any drooping. Thus, this test can be used to clinically differentiate between ocular myasthenia gravis and normal individuals. Since myasthenia gravis affects all skeletal muscles, eyelid drooping is often bilateral. It is sometimes done in conjunction with tensilon test, where edrophonium is injected to look for reversibility of eyelid drooping. In myaesthenia gravis, eyelid drooping is no longer detectable after tensilon test. This test is less sensitive than anti-AChR antibody titers and electromyography, and hence is used only as a screening test in clinical setup.
