= Great Adventure Cigar =

Studio album by Janus Stark
- Released: 11 May 1998
- Genre: Punk rock
- Length: 42:13
- Label: Earache Records (MOSH 186) Trauma Records
- Producer: Terry Thomas

Great Adventure Cigar is the debut full-length by the band Janus Stark, released in 1998 on Earache Records. Its name comes from a line in the Wu Tang Clan song "The Projects".

Two singles were released from this album, "Dynamo" (1998) and "Every Little Thing Counts" (1999). "Every Little Thing Counts" was also included on the soundtrack for the 1998 film, Disturbing Behavior & in the 1999 film, Varsity Blues (film).

== Release history ==
The album was originally released on CD Earache Records on 11 May 1998, but was later re-released the same year on CD and cassette on Trauma Records, on October 27.

== Track listing ==
All songs written by Graham “Gizz” Butt except where indicated.

1. "Enemy Lines" - 3:43
2. "Panic Attack" - 3:14
3. "Every Little Thing Counts" - 4:01 written by Graham “Gizz” Butt and Andrew “Pinch” Pinching
4. "Floyd (What are you on?)" - 3:59 written by Graham “Gizz” Butt and Andrew “Pinch” Pinching
5. "Dynamo" - 5:43
6. "White Man Speak with Fork Tongue" - 4:10
7. "Clique" - 3:56
8. "New Slant on Nothing" - 3:52
9. "200 Duty Frees" - 4:50
10. "Barriers" - 4:45

== Personnel ==
- Gizz Butt - guitars, lead vocals
- Shop - bass, backing vocals
- Pinch - drums, backing vocals

=== Guest musicians ===
- Terry Thomas - backing vocals (tracks 1, 4, 5, 8)
- Simon Burrel - backing vocals (track 1), Hammond organ (track 2), Jazz piano (track 9)
- Andy Hawkins - backing vocals (track 2)
- Richard Gombault - backing vocals (track 2)
- Shaun Atkins - backing vocals (track 5)
