= H. V. Morton =

English-born journalist and travel writer (1892–1979)

- Born: Henry Vollam Morton; 26 July 1892; Ashton-under-Lyne, Lancashire, England
- Died: 18 June 1979 (aged 86); Somerset West, South Africa
- Citizenship: British; South African
- Occupations: Journalist and writer
- Spouse(s): Dorothy Vaughton; Violet Mary Muskett
- Writing career
- Genres: Travel writing, Journalism
- Notable work: In Search of... series
- Website: www.hvmorton.co.uk

Henry Canova Vollam Morton FRSL (known as H. V. Morton), (26 July 1892 – 18 June 1979) was a journalist and pioneering travel writer from Lancashire, England. He was best known for his many books on London, Great Britain and the Holy Land. He first achieved fame in 1923 when, while working for the Daily Express, he covered the opening of the tomb of Tutankhamun by Howard Carter.

== Life ==
=== Early life ===
Morton was born at Ashton-under-Lyne, Lancashire, on 26 July 1892, the son of Joseph Morton, editor of the Birmingham Mail, and Margaret Maclean Ewart. He was educated at King Edward's School in Birmingham but left at the age of 16 to pursue a career in journalism. He served in the Warwickshire Yeomanry during World War I, but saw no combat action. He married Dorothy Vaughton (born 1887) on 14 September 1915. They had three children, Michael, Barbara and John. They later divorced, and on 4 January 1934, he married Violet Mary Muskett (née Greig, born 1900, known as Mary). They had a son, Timothy.

=== Later life ===
In the late 1940s, Morton and Mary immigrated to the Union of South Africa, settling near Cape Town in Somerset West. He later became a South African citizen, and remained a permanent resident until his death in 1979. Mary survived both Morton and their son.

== Journalism ==
Morton's journalism career began in 1910 at the Birmingham Gazette and Express, where his father was an editor. Two years later, he earned promotion to the role of assistant editor and relocated to London, where he would remain for most of his British career. His first position in London was as a sub-editor for the Daily Mail.

After his military service during First World War, he returned to London, working at the Evening Standard in 1919–21, and from 1921 on the Daily Express. His columns in the latter on London life were popular among readers.

Morton also gave readings of his work on BBC Radio.

=== Tomb of Tutankhamun ===
In 1923 the Daily Express sent Morton to Egypt to cover the excavation of Tutankhamun's tomb. Morton was able to provide an eyewitness account of the opening of the inner burial chamber containing the sarcophagus of Tutankhamun, circumventing The Times' exclusive rights to the story. A day after the opening, the Daily Express reported the discovery:

The romantic secret of the tomb of Pharaoh Tutankhamen in the Valley of the Kings at Luxor was revealed yesterday when, for the first time in 3,000 years, the inner chamber of the tomb was entered. Every expectation was surpassed. Within the chamber stood an immense sarcophagus of glittering gold, which is almost certain to contain the mummy of the king. Wonderful paintings, including that of a giant cat, covered the walls. A second chamber was crowded with priceless treasures.

His widely-read articles on the excavation helped establish Morton's reputation as a journalist and were a boon to the popularity of his travel writing and journalism. Between 1931 and 1942, he was "special writer" at the Daily Herald. In 1941, he was a reporter at the Atlantic Charter between Winston Churchill and Franklin D. Roosevelt, which later became the subject of his book Atlantic Meeting, published 1943.

== Travel writing ==
Morton's first book, The Heart of London, appeared in 1925, which developed his popular Daily Express columns. This was followed by two further collections of his writings on London, in The Spell of London (1926), and Nights of London (1926). In 1926 he wrote a series of articles for the Daily Express based on his travels around England in his bull-nosed Morris car. The series was entitled In Search of England and the vignettes were later adapted into the book of the same name. This became a bestseller and the first of his many In Search of... books.

Morton's first foreign travel book, In the Steps of the Master (1934), was well received and sold over half a million copies. The Master of the title was Jesus, and the book was an account of Morton's travels in the Holy Land. This was soon followed by In the Steps of St. Paul (1936), and describes Turkey 13 years after the Turkish War of Independence and its founding as a modern state. This was followed by Through Lands of the Bible (1938) in which he visits Egypt, Palestine, Syria and Iraq. Extracts from all three books were combined and published as Middle East during World War II for British servicemen stationed in the Middle East.

In addition to Atlantic Meeting (1941), Morton wrote three books describing England and the War, including The Ghosts of London (1939), a collection of essays on London; I Saw Two Englands (1942), and I, James Blunt, a fictional description of England after the Nazi victory that served as propaganda for the British Government. A full-length history of London, (In Search of London, 1951), includes a post-war examination of bombing damage inflicted on London during The Blitz. After the war, South Africa was the subject of In Search of South Africa (1948), and shortly afterwards he and his wife immigrated there. During the mid-1950s and '60s he wrote books on Spain and Italy. A Traveller in Italy is situated in northern Italy, while A Traveller in Southern Italy explores the poorer provinces of the south.

== Honours ==
Morton became a Fellow of the Royal Society of Literature (FRSL). Greece made him a Commander of the Order of the Phoenix in 1937 and he was awarded the Order of Merit of the Italian Republic in 1965. A commemorative blue plaque was erected in Ashton-under-Lyne (Morton's birthplace) in June 2004.

== Controversy ==
A controversial biography by Michael Bartholomew, based on Morton's private and public writings, titled In Search of H. V. Morton, was published by Methuen in 2004. According to Bartholomew, based on Morton's private memoirs and diaries, Morton was privately a Nazi sympathizer. In a diary entry from February 1941, he confessed: "I must say Nazi-ism has some fine qualities" and, "I am appalled to discover how many of Hitler's theories appeal to me". In another entry, he described the United States as "that craven nation of Jews and foreigners".

== Publications ==
Morton was a prolific writer, with a body of work consisting of several hundred newspaper, magazine articles and features, in addition to his published books.

Title	Year
The Heart of London	11 June 1925
The Spell of London	11 February 1926
London	June 1926
A London Year	July 29, 1926
The London Scene	1926
The London Year, A Book of Many Moods	1926
The Nights of London	11 November 1926
When You go to London	1927
May Fair: How the Site of a Low Carnival Became the Heart of Fashionable London	1927
In Search of England	2 June 1927
The Call of England	7 June 1928
Fleet Exercise in the Mediterranean	April 1929 (series)
In Search of Scotland	1 August 1929
The Soul of Scotland	1930
In Search of Ireland	4 December 1930
In Search of Wales	16 June 1932
Blue Days at Sea, and Other Essays	20 October 1932
Glastonbury, the Jerusalem of England	1933
What I Saw in The Slums	1933
A London Year (second edition, revised)	1933
In Scotland Again	26 October 1933
In The Steps of the Master	October 1934
Our Fellow Men	7 May 1936
In The Steps of St. Paul	October 1936
London: A Guide	1937
Through Lands of The Bible	27 October 1938
The Ghosts of London	16 November 1939
Travel in War Time	circa 1940
H.V. Morton's London	31 October 1940
Women of the Bible	21 November 1940
Middle East	5 June 1941
I, James Blunt	1942
I Saw Two Englands	15 October 1942
Atlantic Meeting	1 April 1943
Travels in Palestine and Syria	September 1944
In Search of South Africa	21 October 1948
In Search of London	24 May 1951
In The Steps of Jesus	1953
A Stranger in Spain	3 February 1955
A Traveller in Rome	29 August 1957
This is Rome	1959
This is the Holy Land	1961
A Traveller in Italy	24 September 1964
The Waters of Rome	1966
A Traveller in Southern Italy	1969
H.V. Morton's Britain	February 1969
The Fountains of Rome (new edition of The Waters of Rome)	1970
H.V. Morton's England	5 June 1975
The Splendour of Scotland	11 November 1976
The Magic of Ireland	17 August 1978
In Search of The Holy Land	April 1979
