= Simpson Branch (Mineral Fork tributary) =

Stream in the American state of Missouri

Coordinates: 38.043660°N 90.837355°W

Simpson Branch is a stream in Washington County in the U.S. state of Missouri. It is a tributary of Mineral Fork.

Simpson Branch has the name of the local Simpson family.

== See also ==
- List of rivers of Missouri
