= The Ghosts of London =

1939 book by Henry Vollam Morton

The Ghosts Of London is a book written by Henry Vollam Morton ("H.V."), published in 1939 by Methuen & Co Limited in London. Far from being on the subject of ghosts and the supernatural, Morton's book is instead a sentimental portrait of historic London juxtaposed with contemporary (1930s) London. The book is made up of 30 short histories and anecdotes, likely collected from his work as a journalist.

Subjects profiled in the book include snuff, herb shops (including a recipe for making Aqua vitae), the London curfew, hansom cabs, lamplighters, Ely Place, the Royal Waxworks, the bells of St. Paul's Cathedral, Lambeth Palace, Big Ben and Huguenot weavers.

A dozen black-and-white photos appear in the original edition, mostly credited to the London Daily Herald.
