= Sudden Sway =

Pop group in England formed in 1980 and split up in the early 1990s

- Origin: Peterborough, England
- Genres: Art pop, new wave, post-punk, synthpop
- Years active: 1980–1990
- Labels: Chant, Blanco y Negro, Rough Trade
- Past members: Michael McGuire; Pete Jostins; Simon Childs

Sudden Sway were an English band and conceptual art collective from Peterborough, formed in 1980. They recorded two sessions for John Peel and released three albums before splitting up in the early 1990s.

== History ==
Sudden Sway was formed in 1980 by Mike McGuire (vocals) and Steve Rolls (guitar) after disbanding first generation punk band the Now. They recruited Pete Jostins (bass), Shaun Foreman (guitar/keyboards) and Colin Meech (drums), with various others contributing in their early days. Whilst were initially influenced by fairly standard indie bands of the day such as A Certain Ratio and Shriekback, their work gradually took on an idiosyncratic bent, incorporating elements of radio drama, science fiction and conceptual art, where they often presented themselves as more of a company or product than a conventional band.

Their first releases were two self-financed singles, "Jane's Third Party" and the To You, with Regard EP, in 1980 and 1981 respectively. The latter was recorded with the core line up of McGuire and Jostins plus new guitarist Simon Childs. Together with two well received John Peel radio seasons, they were sufficiently successful to attract major-label interest from CBS and Virgin Records.

After a further single "The Traffic Tax Scheme", which came in an unusual elongated package containing a computer program for the ZX Spectrum, on their own Chant label, Sudden Sway signed a deal with Warner's subsidiary Blanco y Negro, debuting on the label in 1986 with eight versions of the single "Sing Song". After releasing the Spacemate package - a double LP, book, poster, set of cards and instruction manual, packaged together in a soap box container and designed by Jon Wozencroft, the band moved on to indie label Rough Trade Records, where they would stay for the rest of their career.

Sudden Sway's fondness for short songs was evident on their first Rough Trade release, a 7-inch EP featuring eight, one minute spoof advertising jingles titled Autumn Cut Back Job Lot Offer, released in early 1987. Around the same time, they staged Home Is Heavenly Springs, an installation at the Institute of Contemporary Arts that satirised new town planning, where the band, who rarely played live, performed as a “human jukebox” from inside a specially built sound booth, taking requests from visitors.

The following year, Sudden Sway released their second album, '76 Kids Forever, which they described as a "soap opera musical" about a group of friends from Netherton, Peterborough that came of age during the punk explosion, and how their lives have panned out a decade later. The band continued (minus Simon Childs) for one final effort, 1990's Ko-Opera album, a very different proposition as they utilized contemporary dance beats to deconstruct early '90s consumerism. Its release coincided with Klub Londinium, a series of guided walks around London that blurred the lines between nightlife, urban exploration, and performance art. This was to be their swan song with the band splitting up soon after, with an unheard and unreleased album in the can.

The band recorded two sessions for John Peel's BBC Radio 1 programme, in 1983 ("Let's Evolve", "Relationships") and 1984 ("A Walk in the Park", "Problem-Solving Broadcasts 1-3", "T Minus Tranquility"); the first released as an EP in 1986. They also made an appearance on Whistle Test, performing "Packet of Vacuum", "Father I Do" and “Gary Guerilla, Household Militia", plus an appearance on C4's Night Network, playing "Solo Store Detective Man".

== Discography ==
=== Albums ===
- Spacemate double-LP (1986), Blanco y Negro BYN8B
- '76 Kids Forever (1988), Rough Trade
- Ko-Opera (1990), Rough Trade

=== Singles ===
- "Jane's Third Party" b/w "Don't Go" (1980), Chant 1A
- To You, with Regard - 12" EP (1981), Chant EJSP9692
- "The Traffic Tax Scheme" - 7" single with 2 songs and computer program (1984), Chant SRTS 82 CUS 1592
- Sing Song V1-V8 - eight different versions of the same song (1986), Blanco y Negro NEG18
- Peel Session 16.11.83 EP (1986), Strange Fruit (UK Indie #17)
- Autumn Cutback Job Lot Offer EP (1987), Rough Trade RT183
- Sat'day Mornin Episode EP (1987), Rough Trade RTT213 (12" only)

=== Compilation appearances ===
- "Fatherized" (1985) on Sounds Christmas Cracker EP
