= Itchy (band) =

German punk rock band

ITCHY
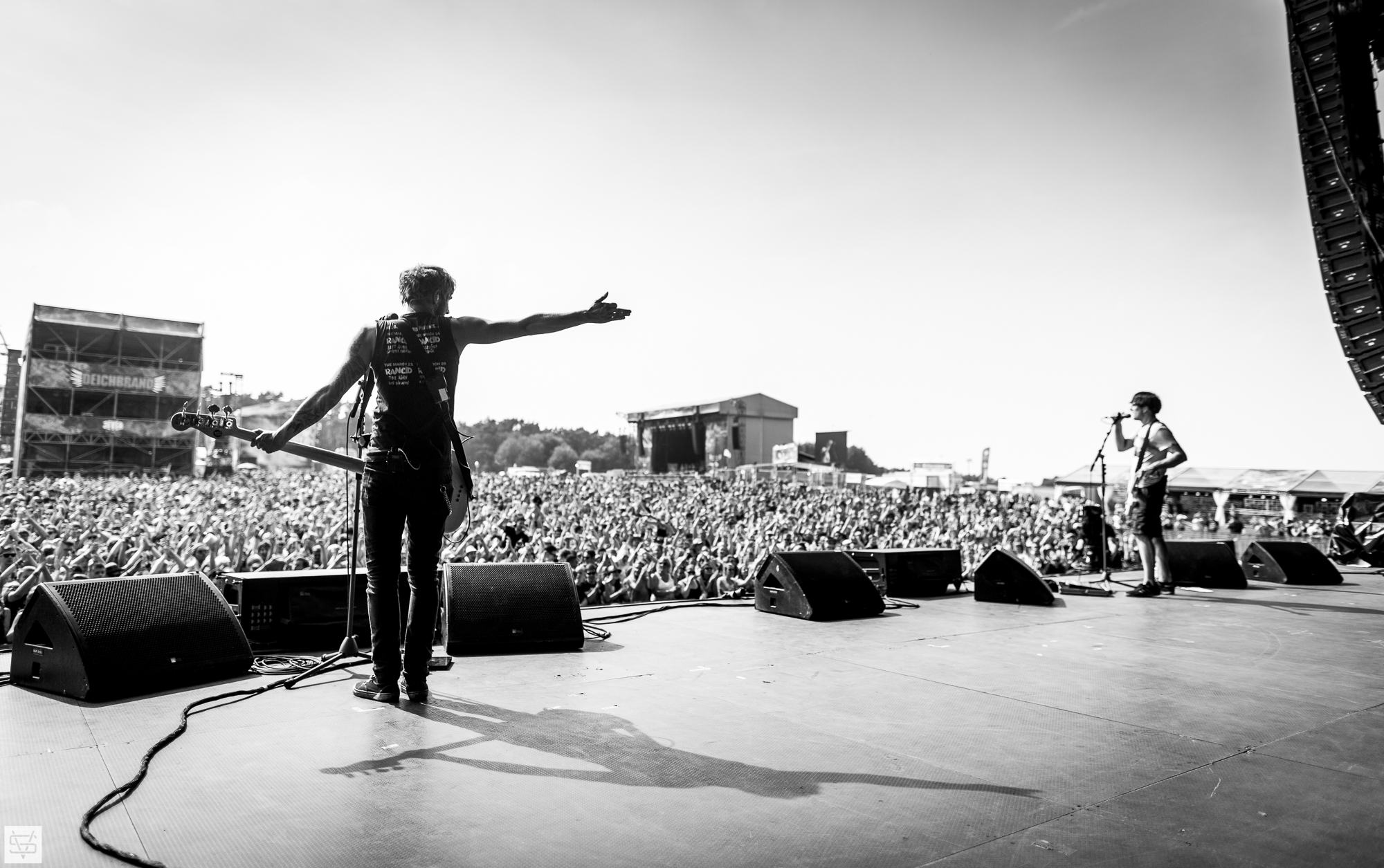
- Itchy Poopzkid at Deichbrand Festival 2015

Background information
- Genres: Punk, pop punk, alternative rock
- Years active: 2001–present
- Labels: Findaway Records, Arising Empire
- Members: Sibbi (Sebastian Hafner); Panzer (Daniel Friedl); Max (Maximilian Zimmer) (since 2011)
- Past members: Saikov (Tobias Danne) (2001–2011)
- Website: www.itchyofficial.com

Itchy (formerly Itchy Poopzkid) is a German punk rock band formed in 2001. The group consists of Sebastian Hafner (vocals, guitar, bass), Daniel Friedl (vocals, guitar, bass) and Max Zimmer (drums).

They have released nine albums many of which entered the German charts. They released albums on their own record label, Findaway Records, until their 7th album which was released through Arising Empire. They have played more than 900 shows throughout Europe.

Up until the release of their single "Nothing" in April 2017, they toured under the name of "Itchy Poopzkid." They stated that their former name was an "unbelievably dumb band name."

On 21 July 2017, the band released their 7th studio album All We Know and they embarked on a big tour through various countries.

On 15 November 2019, Itchy released a new single and music video Faust from their 8th album Ja Als Ob which was released in 2020. On 7 July, 2023, Itchy released a new Album Dive.

The band has also authored 2 volumes of advice on working in a rock band: How to Survive as a Rock Band in volumes 1 and 2. The first was released in 2015, and the second in 2021.

== Discography ==
Studio albums

- 2005: Heart to Believe
- 2007: Time to Ignite
- 2009: Dead Serious
- 2011: Lights Out London
- 2013: Ports & Chords
- 2015: Six
- 2017: All We Know
- 2020: Ja als ob
- 2023: Dive
- 2026: Happy Little Accidents

Live albums

- 2004: Fuck-Ups ... Live!

EPs

- 2001: Two Thumbs Down (Demo)
- 2003: ... Having a Time!

Singles

- 2005: Say No
- 2007: Silence Is Killing Me
- 2007: And I'll Walk Away
- 2007: You Don't Bring Me Down
- 2009: The Living
- 2009: Pretty Me
- 2009: The Lottery
- 2011: Why Still Bother
- 2011: Down Down Down
- 2011: It's Tricky (Run DMC Cover)
- 2012: We Say So
- 2013: I Believe
- 2013: The Pirate Song (feat. Guido (Donots))
- 2013: Tonight
- 2014: Out There
- 2015: Dancing in the Sun
- 2015: Kings & Queens
- 2017: Nothing
- 2017: Keep It Real
- 2017: Fall Apart
- 2018: Stuck with the Devil (Grossstadtgeflüster Remix)
- 2018: Kill Tomorrow
- 2019: Faust
- 2019: Ja als ob
- 2020: Ich wollte noch
- 2020: Gegen den Wind
- 2020: So wie ihr
- 2020: Tut uns leid
- 2022: Womanarchist (feat. Cecilia Boström)
- 2023: Prison light
- 2023: Thoughts & players
- 2023: Dive
- 2023: Broke forever
- 2023: No one's listening
- 2023: Burn the Whole Thing Down
- 2023: Photographs
- 2026: Tribute Song
- 2026: Oh Boy
- 2026: Bleeding Heads And Heart Attacks
- 2026: Today
- 2026: Kill The Party
