= Princeton University Art Museum =

Art museum in New Jersey, US

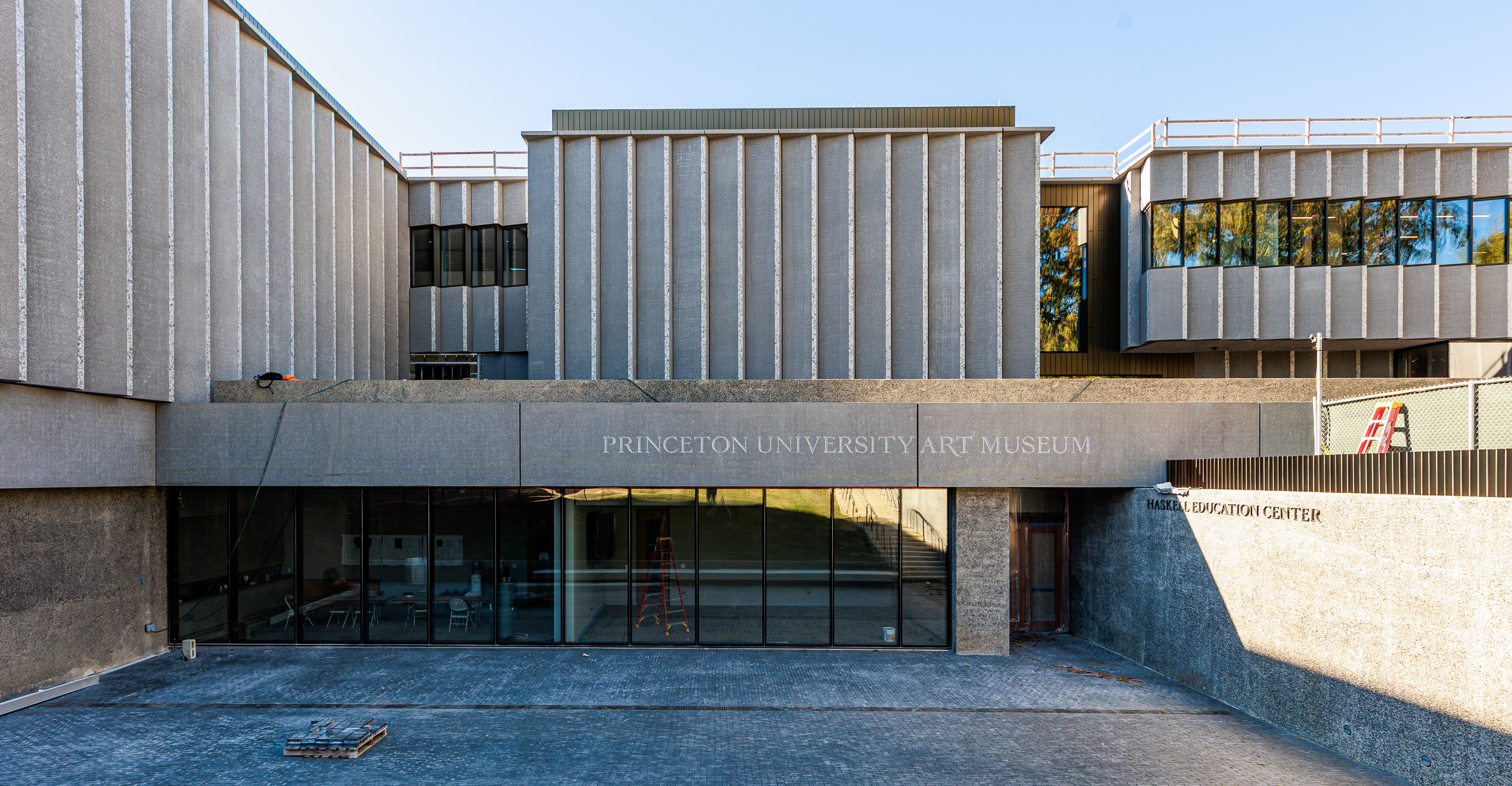
- Established: 1882
- Type: Art Museum
- Collection size: 117,000
- Visitors: 200,000
- Director: James Christen Steward
- Public transit access: Princeton (NJT station)
- Parking: Nassau Street, Spring Street Parking Garage
- Website: artmuseum.princeton.edu
- McCormick Hall (1923)
- U.S. Historic district – Contributing property
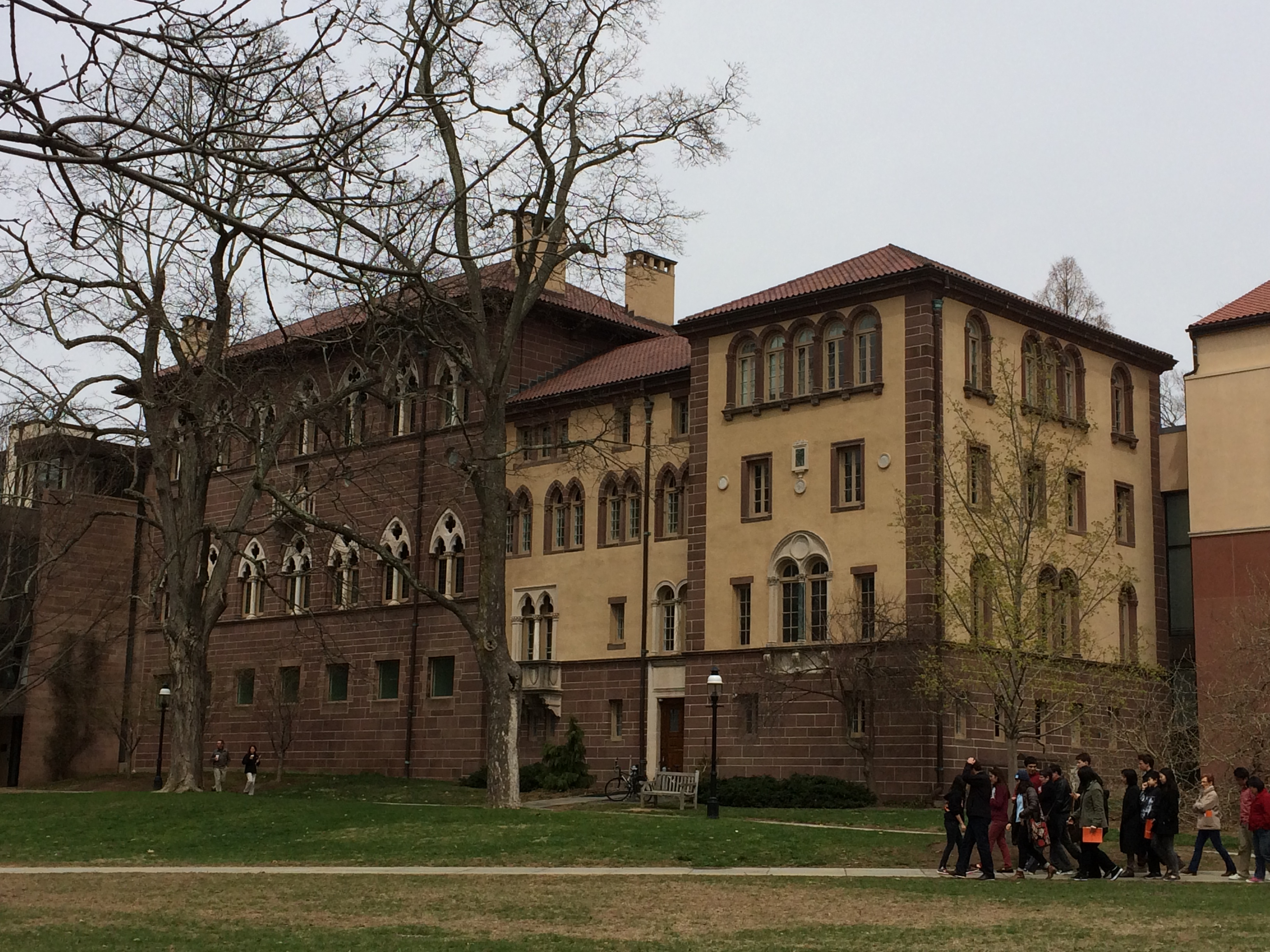

- Location within Mercer County, New Jersey
- Location: McCormick Hall, Princeton, New Jersey
- Coordinates: 40°20′49.9″N 74°39′28.9″W
- Built: 1923
- Architect: Ralph Adams Cram
- Architectural style: Venetian Gothic
- Part of: Princeton Historic District (ID75001143)
- Designated CP: 27 June 1975

The Princeton University Art Museum (PUAM) is the Princeton University gallery of art, located in Princeton, New Jersey. With a collecting history that began in 1755, the museum was formally established in 1882, and now houses over 117,000 works of art ranging from antiquity to the contemporary period. The Princeton University Art Museum dedicates itself to supporting and enhancing the university's goals of teaching, research, and service in fields of art and culture, as well as to serving regional communities and visitors from around the world. Its collections concentrate on the Mediterranean region, Western Europe, Asia, the United States, and Latin America.

The museum has a large collection of Greek and Roman antiquities, including ceramics, marbles, bronzes, and Roman mosaics from Princeton University's excavations in Antioch. Medieval Europe is represented by sculpture, metalwork, and stained glass. The collection of Western European paintings includes examples from the early Renaissance through the nineteenth century, and there is a growing collection of twentieth-century and contemporary art. Photographic holdings are a particular strength, numbering over 27,000 works from the invention of daguerreotype in 1839 to the present. The museum is also noted for its Asian art gallery, which includes a wide collection of Chinese calligraphy, painting, ancient bronze works, jade carvings as well as porcelain selections. In addition to its collections, the museum mounts regular temporary exhibitions featuring works from its own holdings as well as loans made from public and private collections around the world.

Admission is free and the museum is open Monday - Wednesday 10:00 am to 5:00 pm, Thursday - Friday 10:00 am to 8:00 pm, Saturday 10:00 am to 5:00 pm, and Sunday 12:00 to 5:00 pm.

A new building for the museum has been constructed on the same site over the course of four years starting in 2021 with David Adjaye serving as architect. Demolition of the former facility began in June 2021; construction of the 145,000 square foot facility began late that year. The Museum reopened on October 31, 2025, with a 24-hour open house to commemorate the occasion.

The Princeton University Art Museum is part of the Monuments Men and Women Museum Network, launched in 2021 by the Monuments Men Foundation for the Preservation of Art. Several "monuments men" are alumni of Princeton University.

== History ==
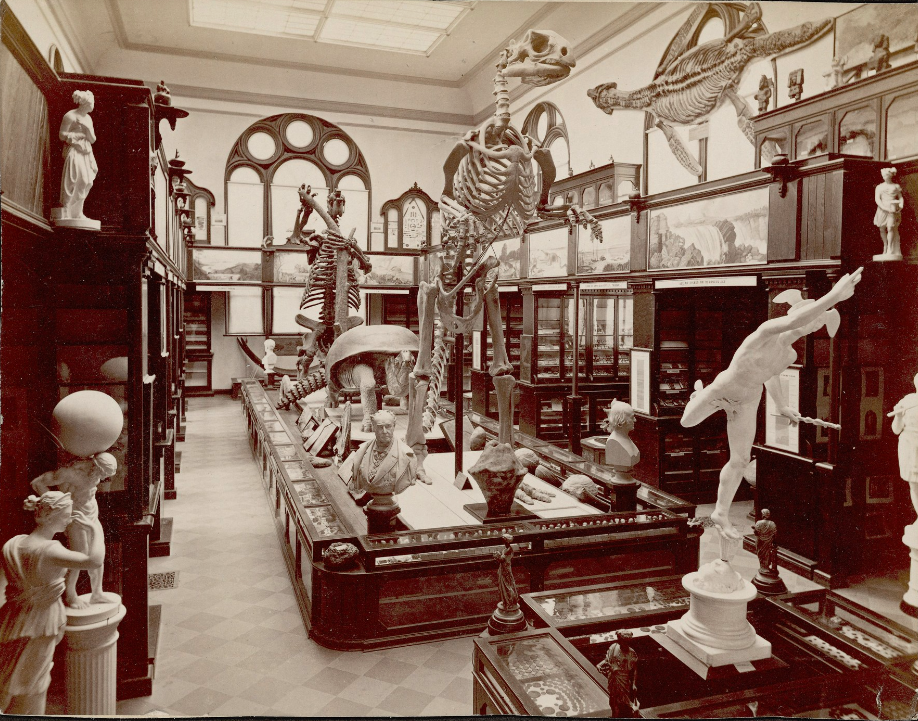
The Faculty Room of Nassau Hall in 1886, when it served as home to the Art Museum

=== Beginnings ===
The first art work owned and displayed by the College of New Jersey (renamed Princeton University in 1896) was a full-length portrait of Jonathan Belcher, the governor of the province of New Jersey who had promoted the establishment of the college. The portrait was a donation from Belcher himself, given shortly before the college moved in 1756 to the newly built Nassau Hall. It was joined by a portrait of King George II, who had issued the letters patent establishing the college. The two portraits hung in the central prayer hall, and were displayed alongside various antiquities and objects of natural history. The two paintings were destroyed during the 1777 Battle of Princeton and further objects were lost in the 1802 Nassau Hall fire, but the college continued its commitment to collecting and teaching from works of art and historical note.

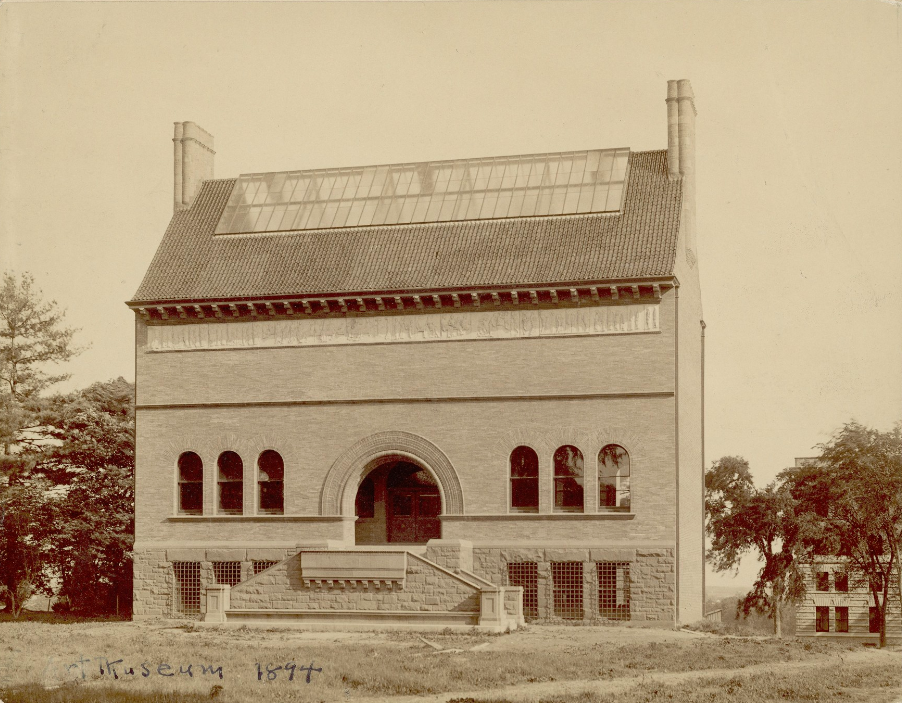
The first building purpose-built for the Art Museum, in an 1894 photo

=== Establishment ===
The creation of the Art Museum in a more formal sense took place under the leadership of James McCosh, who served as president of the College of New Jersey from 1868–88. The Scottish McCosh brought with him from Europe new progressive academic disciplines, including the history of art. By 1882, McCosh charged William Cowper Prime, a Princeton alumnus and founding trustee of the Metropolitan Museum of Art, and George B. McClellan, the Civil War general and then governor of New Jersey, with creating a curriculum in the subject. They argued: "The foundation of any system of education in Historic Art must obviously be in object study. A museum of art objects is so necessary to the system that without it we are of [the] opinion it would be of small utility to introduce the proposed department.” The intention was to go beyond the fields of art and classics to include, “many other branches of the collegiate course.” They anticipated, “large future growth,” as the college could “look with confidence to her sons, in all parts of the world,” for future donations.

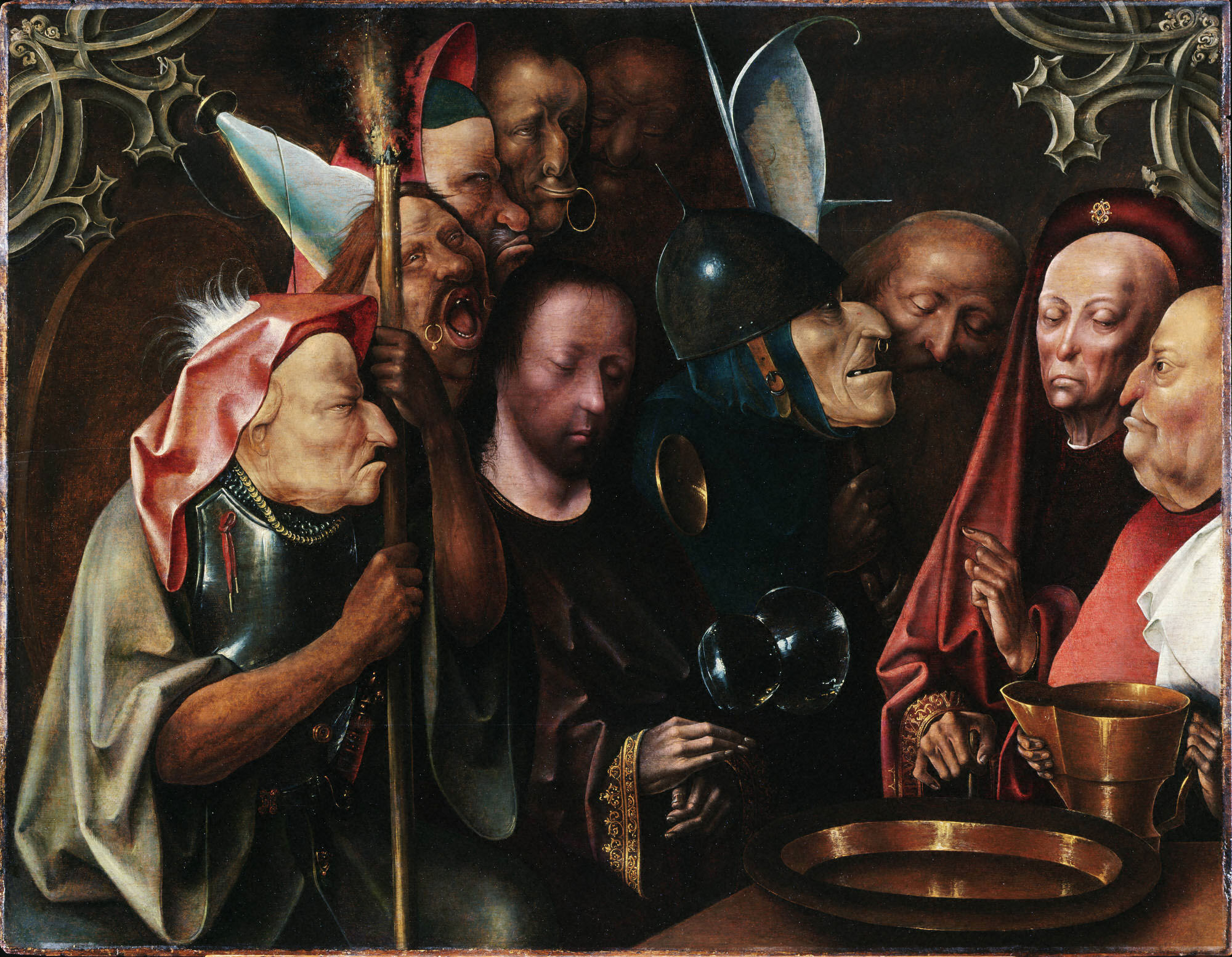
Hieronymus Bosch or a member of his circle, Christ Before Pilate, ca. 1520, gift of Allan Marquand

==== Allan Marquand (1882–1922) ====
The museum, and what is now the Department of Art and Archaeology, were formally created in 1882, with Allan Marquand, of the Princeton Class of 1874, serving as the inaugural lecturer in the new department and director of the museum, a position he would hold until his retirement in 1922. Marquand was previously instructor in Latin and logic at the college and was the son of Henry Gurdon Marquand, a major benefactor of the college and one of the founders of the Metropolitan Museum of Art. The collections of the museum were initially held in Nassau Hall, along with the growing natural history collection of professor Arnold Henry Guyot, part of which is still on display in Guyot Hall. A new purpose-built fireproof Romanesque Revival Museum was designed by A. Page Brown and completed in 1890 on the site of the current museum.

On completion of the building the museum received the Trumball-Prime collection of pottery and porcelain from William Prime and his wife. Early additions included the purchase of a large collection of Cypriot pottery from the Metropolitan Museum in 1890, and purchases of Etruscan, Roman, and South Italian pottery. Marquand established an endowment from his own resources to enable further purchases and it was significantly augmented by a donation from Edward Harkness.

=== Growth ===
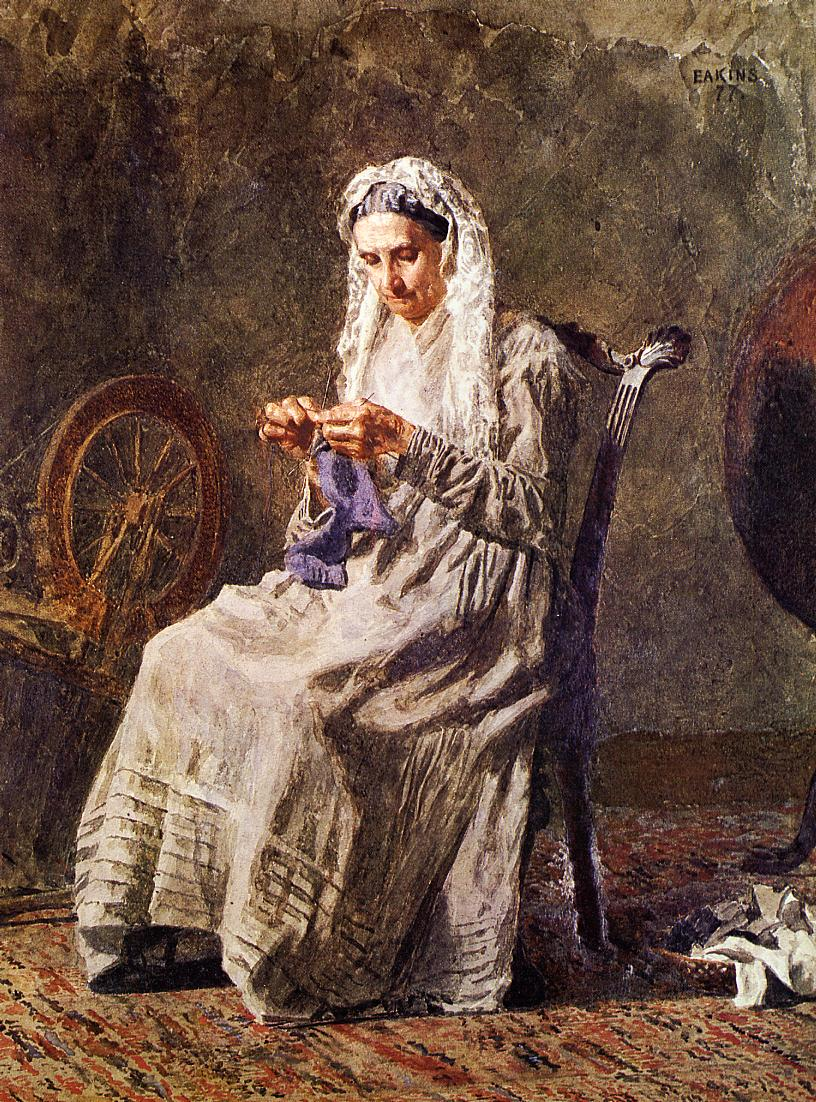
Thomas Eakins, Seventy Years Ago, 1877, Gift of Mrs. Frank Jewett Mather Jr.

==== Frank Jewett Mather Jr. (1922–46) ====
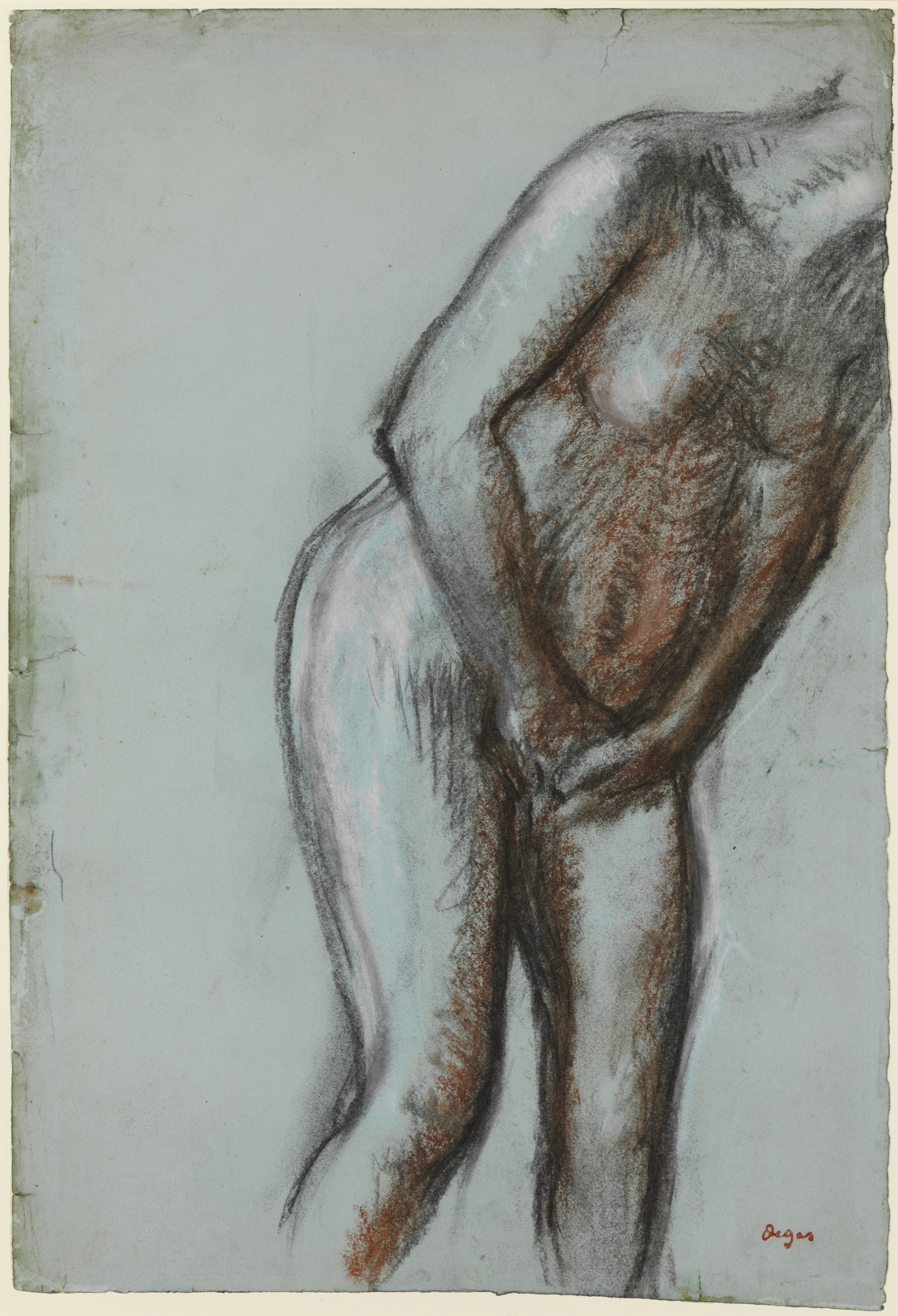
Edgar Degas, Bather (Standing Female Nude), 1917, Gift of Frank Jewett Mather Jr.

Frank Jewett Mather joined the faculty in 1910 and succeeded Marquand as museum director in 1922. He was a collector of Medieval and Renaissance art but also led the university to large holdings of paintings and prints, including the 1933 bequest of several thousand objects by Junius Spencer Morgan II, of the Princeton Class of 1888. In 1923, the first of many expansions of the Art Museum was completed with the addition of the Venetian Gothic McCormick Hall, designed by Ralph Adams Cram and donated by the family of Cyrus McCormick, Jr., Class of 1879 and Harold Fowler McCormick, Class of 1895. The new building enabled the older structure to be devoted solely to the museum, and led to the creation of a hall of casts on the ground floor.

As Marquand had before him, Mather augmented the museum's collections through the use of his personal fortune, with contributions ranging from Classical and Pre-Columbian antiquities, to illuminated manuscripts, and what became one of the finest collections of American drawings in the country. Major gifts during the 1930s included a collection of more than 40 Italian paintings from Henry White Cannon, Jr., of the Class of 1910, and more than 500 snuff bottles, still one of the finest such collections in the country, from Colonel James A. Blair, Class of 1903. The decade also saw significant collections of Chinese and Japanese art added to support the courses of George Rowley, the first in those fields in an American university. The World War II years ushered in the first classes in American art.

Notable exhibitions during Mather's tenure included one of works by Paul Cézanne, borrowed from Duncan Philips, and one of highlights from the Museum of Modern Art. Before his retirement in 1946, he oversaw a massive influx of Antioch mosaics from the archaeological digs at Antioch-on-the-Orontes in which the university had played a leading part. Some of the mosaics can be found today not only in the museum but also in various places in Firestone Library. He also welcomed the collection of Dan Fellows Platt, a massive assortment of fine objects which arrived by van during the war.

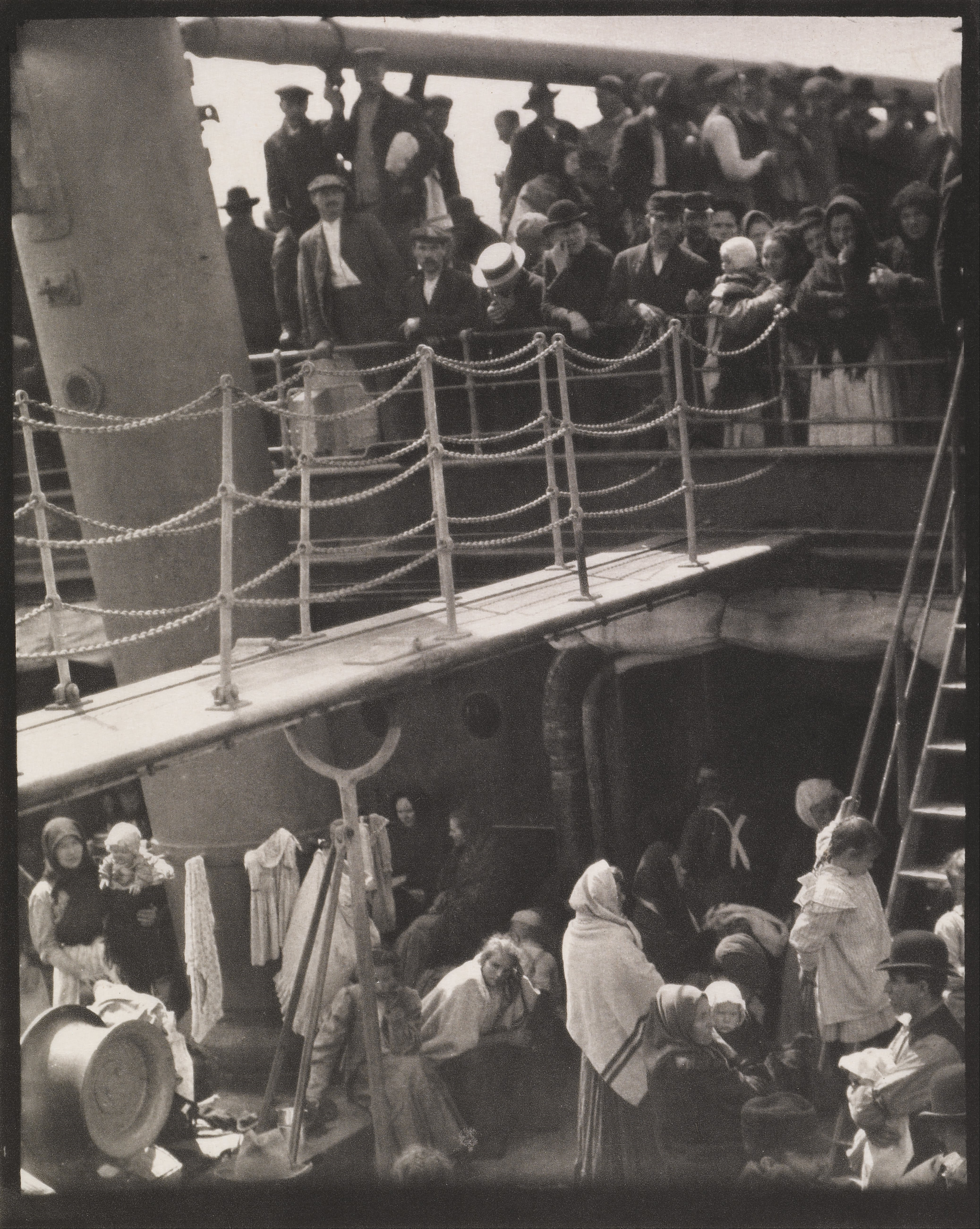
Alfred Stieglitz, The Steerage, 1907, the first photo added to the museum's collection, gift of Frank Jewett Mather Jr.

==== Ernest DeWald (1946–60) ====
Mather was succeeded by Ernest DeWald, a graduate school alumnus of the Class of 1946, one of the Monuments Men who had been charged with protecting the cultural heritage of Europe during the war. A large number of Princetonians, both alumni and faculty, served with the Monuments program, leading the Kunsthistorisches Museum in Vienna to loan the museum The Art of Painting by Johannes Vermeer as a sign of gratitude. DeWald was noted for his conservation work, personally cleaning paintings in his office on the top floor of the museum. For the university's bicentennial in 1946, he refurbished the galleries, including displaying a new collection of Chinese scrolls and paintings donated by Dr. DuBois Schanck Morris, Class of 1893. Under DeWald's tenure, the museum's collection of Asian art greatly increased, aided by the guidance of Professor Wen C. Fong, Class of 1951, who would go on to be the founding director of the Metropolitan Museum of Art's Asian department. In 1949, Alfred Stieglitz's 1907 The Steerage was the first of the museum's now considerable collection of photographs.

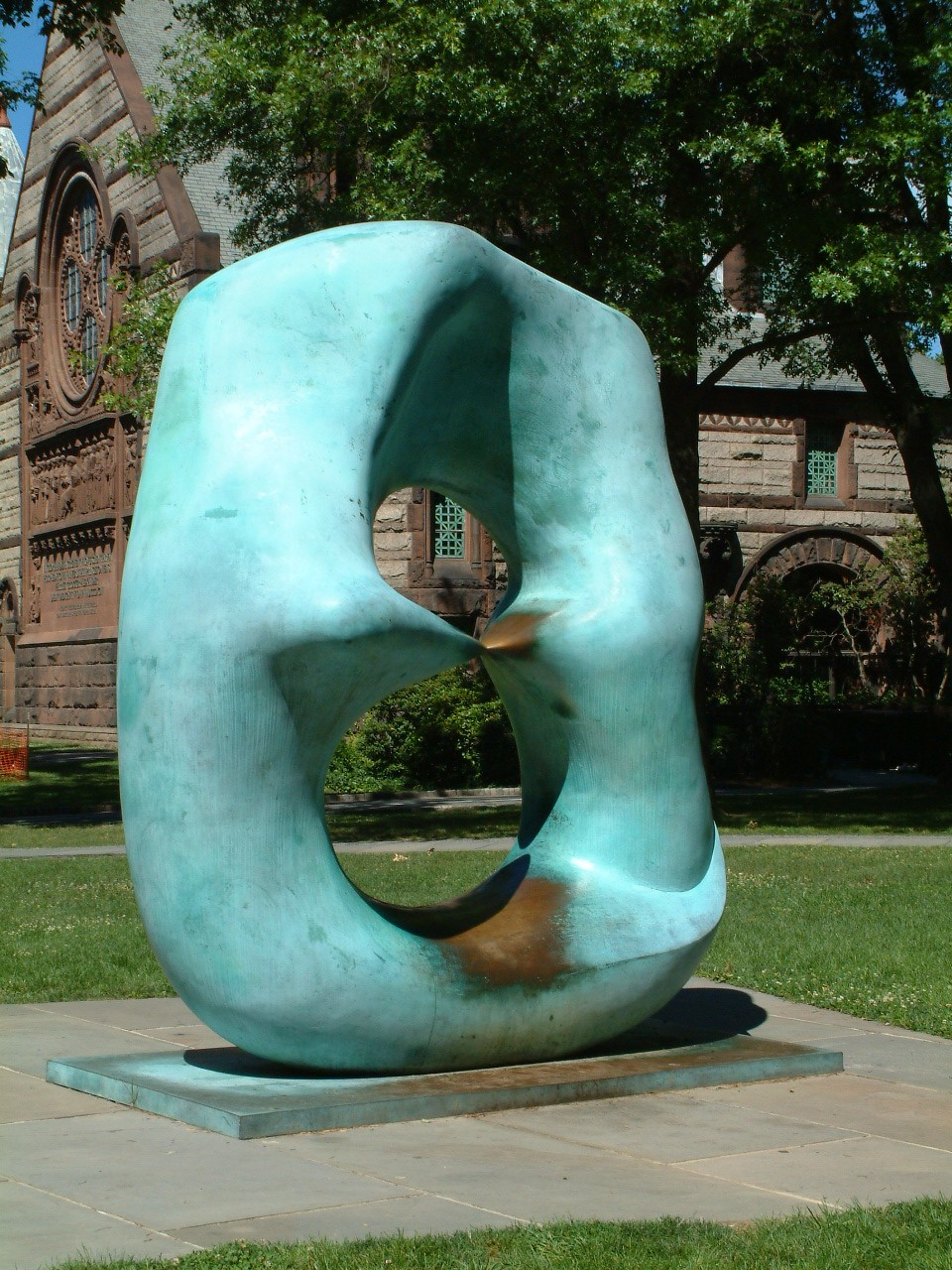
Henry Moore, Oval with Points, 1969–1970, part of the Putnam Collection, often called "Nixon's Nose" by students

==== Patrick Joseph Kelleher (1960–73) ====
Patrick Joseph Kelleher, Class of 1947 and another Monuments Man, succeeded DeWald as director in 1960. He spearheaded the construction of a new home for the museum, made possible by the university's landmark $53 million capital campaign. In 1962 the collections were removed to enable the demolition of the A. Page Brown building and the northern wing of the Ralph Adams Cram structure to make way for a Steinmann and Cain designed, International Style building, completed in 1966.

Perhaps the most visible art on the campus is the Putnam Collection of Sculpture. The collection is the result of an anonymous million dollar 1968 donation in honor of Lieutenant John B. Putnam Jr., of the Princeton Class of 1945, who lost his life in a plane crash during World War II. The collection was assembled in 1969 and 1970 by a committee led by Kelleher and including Alfred H. Barr, Jr. and Thomas Hoving. It contains works by seventeen major twentieth century sculptors, including Alexander Calder, Pablo Picasso, Henry Moore, Louise Nevelson, Isamu Noguchi, David Smith, and Tony Smith.

Kelleher's directorship also saw an increasing focus on photography as an important element of the museum's collections. David Hunter McAlpin, Class of 1920, gave a major collection of photographs to the museum in 1971 as well as endowing a fund for further purchases and a professorship, the first endowed chair in the history of photography in the country. That professorship was occupied by Peter Bunnell, who would go on to succeed Kelleher as director in 1973.

=== Further expansion ===
Peter Bunnell served as director until 1978, training a generation of leading scholars and curators of photography, and giving Princeton a preeminent place in the field with a collection in excess of 27,000 photographs, and significant archives of photographers including Clarence Hudson White, Minor White, and Ruth Bernhard. In 1980, Allen Rosenbaum became director, focusing on expanding the museums collection of Old Masters, notably Renaissance and Baroque paintings in the Mannerist tradition. In 1989, Rosenbaum oversaw another expansion of the museum's physical plant, the 27,000 square feet (2,500 m^{2}) Mitchell Wolfson, Jr., Class of 1963, Wing. The new wing, designed by Mitchell/Giurgola, provided additional exhibition space, a conservation studio, as well as seminar and study-storage rooms for all areas of the museum's collection.

Under Susan M. Taylor's directorship in the first decade of the 21st century, the museum established its first endowed curatorships. The current director, James Steward, presides over a collection of more than 117,000 objects, supplemented by notable collections on long-term loan, including works of modern art from the Sonnabend Collection and perhaps the finest collection of paintings by Jean-Michel Basquiat, on loan from Herbert Schorr, Graduate School Class of 1963, and his wife, Lenore.

In 2015 the museum was listed by Fodor's as one of the top 15 United States museums located in a small-town, further described as "one of the best university art museums in the world."

=== Adjaye building ===
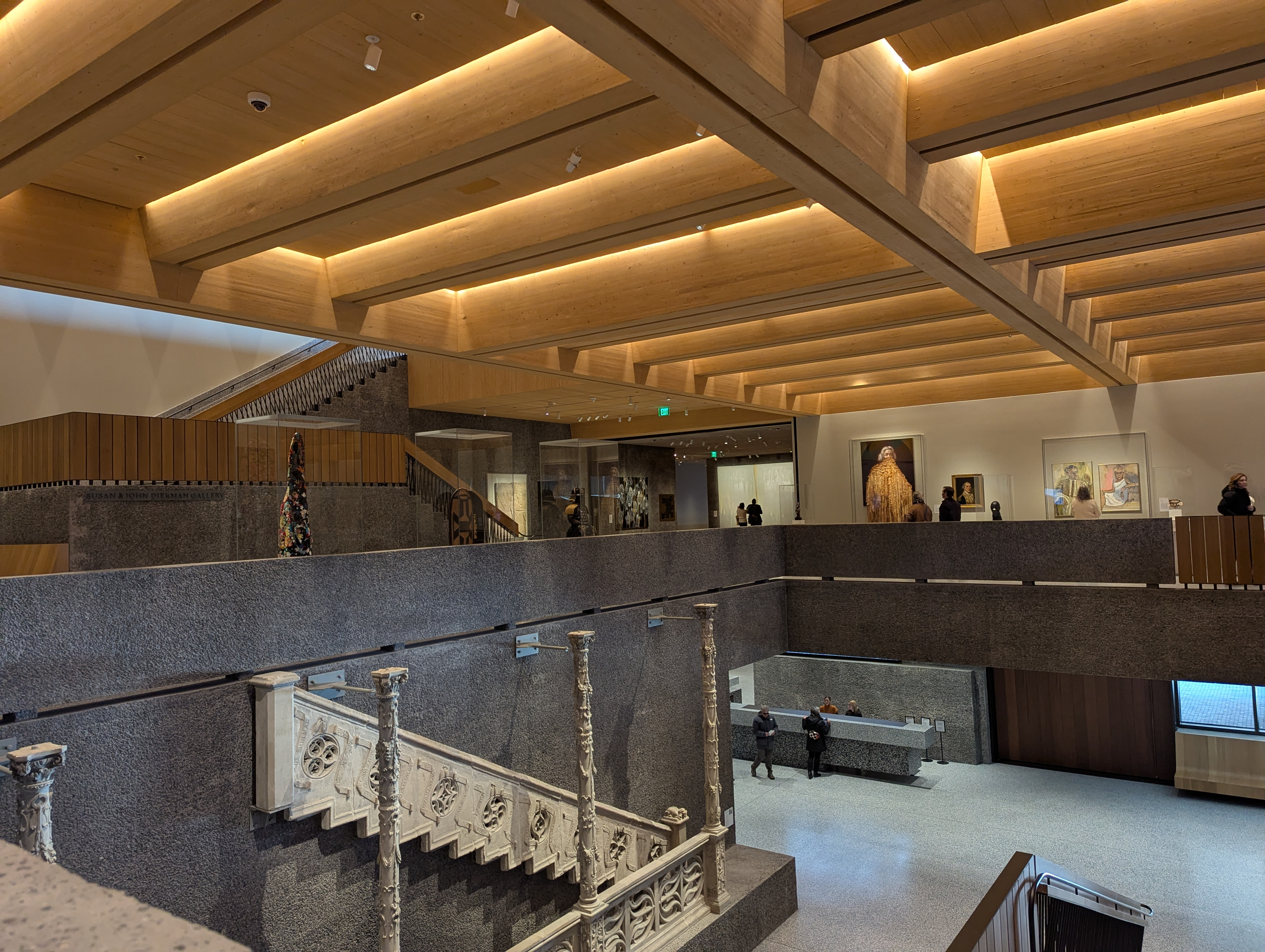
The Orientation Gallery in the new museum building

In 2018, architect David Adjaye, his firm Adjaye Associates, and executive architects Cooper Robertson were commissioned to design a wholly new 144,000 square feet (13,400 square metres) facility, which is set to double the museum in size. The three-story museum consists of nine interlocking pavilions with visible storage space and spots where artworks can be inset into floors and walls; one of the pavillions is the Marquand Library, Princeton’s art history library which could not be moved. In addition to the museum galleries, the building will incorporate a home for the university's department of art and archaeology and a triple-height grand hall, numerous classroom spaces, seminar rooms, creativity labs and a rooftop café. Construction on the new museum began in summer 2021; In 2023, the museum's construction and design was handed off to the firm Cooper Robertson after Adjaye faced allegations of sexual assault.

In anticipation of these disruptions, in September 2019 the museum opened Art@Bainbridge in historic Bainbridge House as a gallery space for experimental work. Two months later it opened a satellite museum store on Palmer Square in downtown Princeton. In late 2021, the museum opened a second, interim gallery space known as Art on Hulfish, largely dedicated to photography and time-based media, which it operated until January 2025, closing it in anticipation of the new museum's opening later in the year.

The new facility opened on October 31, 2025 with a special 24 hour opening period running until the following day. The new building had cost approximately $300 million to build, and the museum's operating budget has risen to $30 million, comparable to the budget of the Harvard Art Museums and the Frick Collection.

== Collections ==
=== African art ===
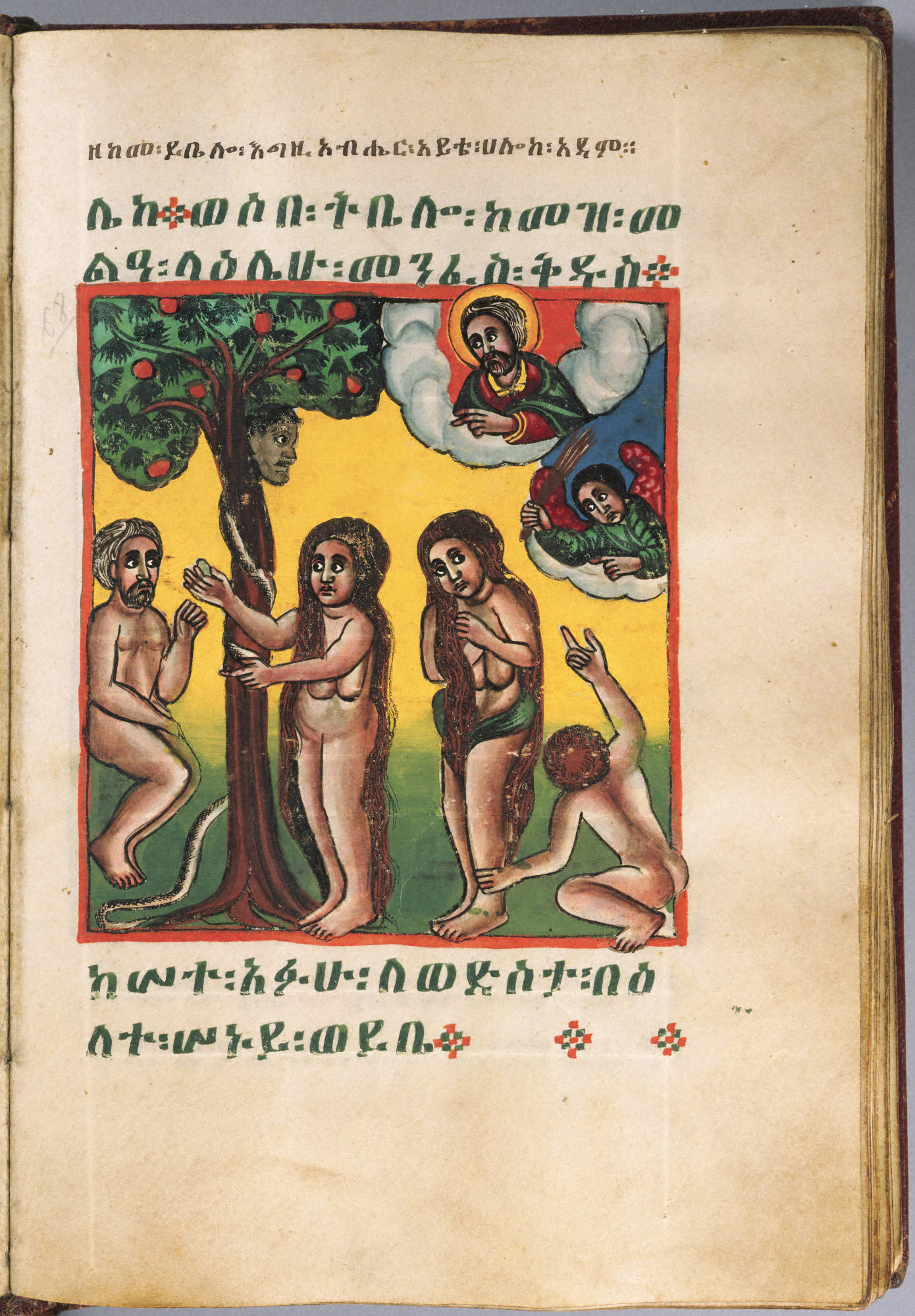
Ethiopian, Illuminated Manuscript, 18th century

The collection of African art is designed to reveal the diversity of artistic work across the continent. Objects are on display from west, central, and South Africa, ranging from royal regalia and objects of prestige, to sculptures marking rites of passage, to those intended to facilitate interaction with spiritual entities.

The first bequest to the Museum of African art was made in 1953 by Mrs. Donald B. Doyle, in honor of her husband. That collection was accumulated before 1923 in what is now the Democratic Republic of the Congo, and includes a distinctively shaped Kuba box and a rare double caryatid headrest from the Chokwe people. More recent gifts have been made by Perry E.H. Smith, including a Chokwe chair, and by H. Kelly Rollings, among whose gifts is an emblem of the Leopard Society, a notable example of an accumulative object from the Cross River region. A 1998 bequest of John B. Elliot includes many objects of daily use and adornment, as well as Akan gold pieces, from a linguist's staff to a chief's bracelet. In 2003, a Yoruba stool was acquired, considered a sculptural masterpiece that served as the focus of devotion to the god Esu.

The African art collection has grown steadfastly as an area of growing interest over the past twenty years, particularly since the appointment in 1997 of Princeton's first professor of African art history, Chika Okeke-Agulu, and the naming in 2022 of its first curator of African art, Perrin Lathrop.

Media related to African art in the Princeton University Art Museum at Wikimedia Commons

=== American art ===
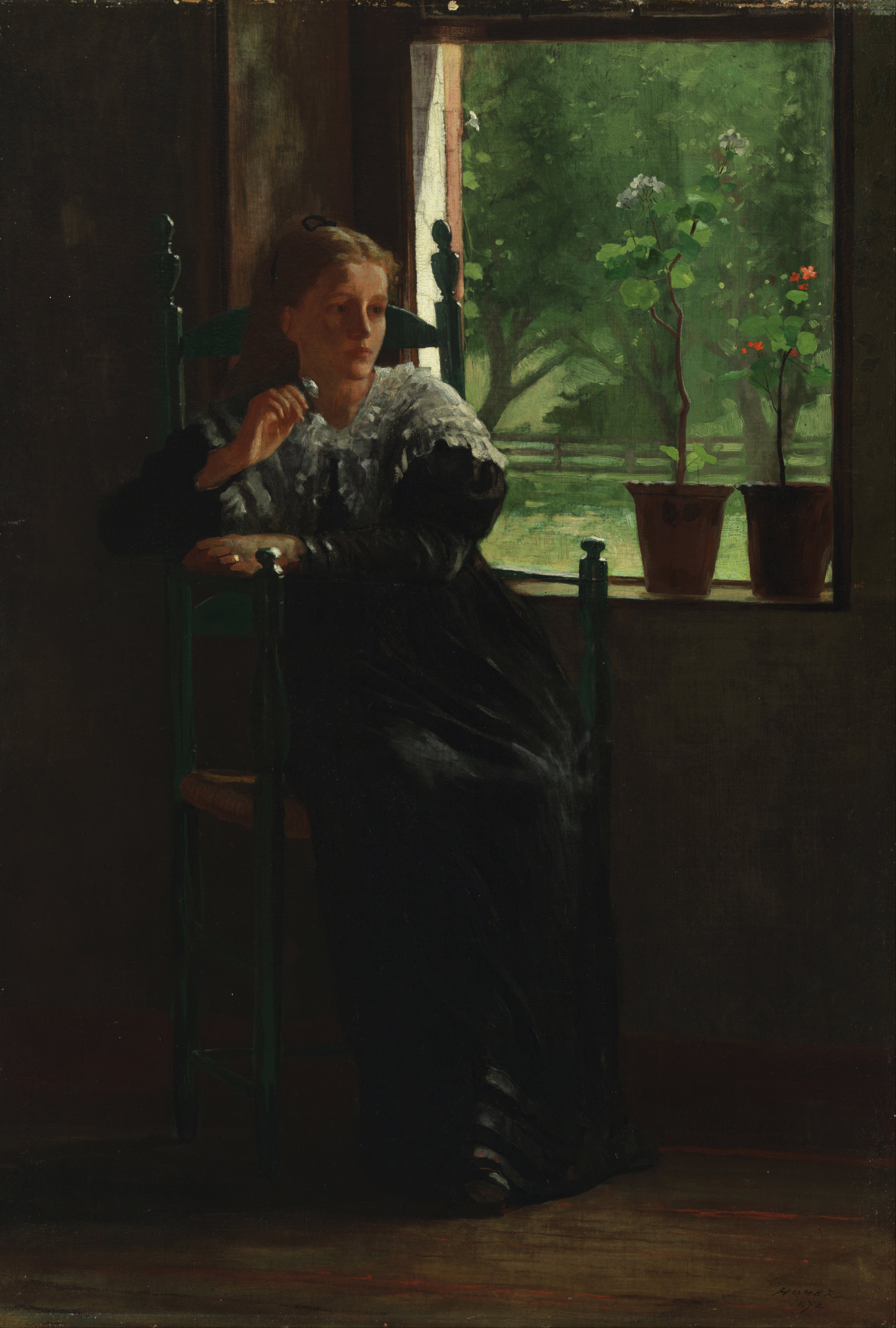
Winslow Homer, At the Window, 1872

The university received its first pieces of American art in the 1750s, but only started collecting in earnest under the directorship of Frank Jewett Mather Jr. (1922–46). Few museums accorded significance to American art at the time, allowing Princeton to amass a collection that is among the finest of any academic museum. The collection is particularly strong in painting and sculpture, greatly aided by the large number of portraits of figures affiliated with the university. The museum is strong in the area of landscape painting, especially from the Hudson River School.

The Boudinot Collection of primarily 18th century fine and decorative art were formerly on display in period rooms created in the museum facility constructed in the 1960s, and subsequently at the nearby Morven Museum and Garden, whose original owners, the Stockton family, were relatives of the Boudinots. Alumnus Edward Duff Balken's donation of Folk art led to a substantial collection in that area. New acquisitions, enabled by dedicated endowed funds, are focused on areas where the collection has been less strong, notably still life, genre painting, works by native makers, and African American art.

Media related to American art in the Princeton University Art Museum at Wikimedia Commons

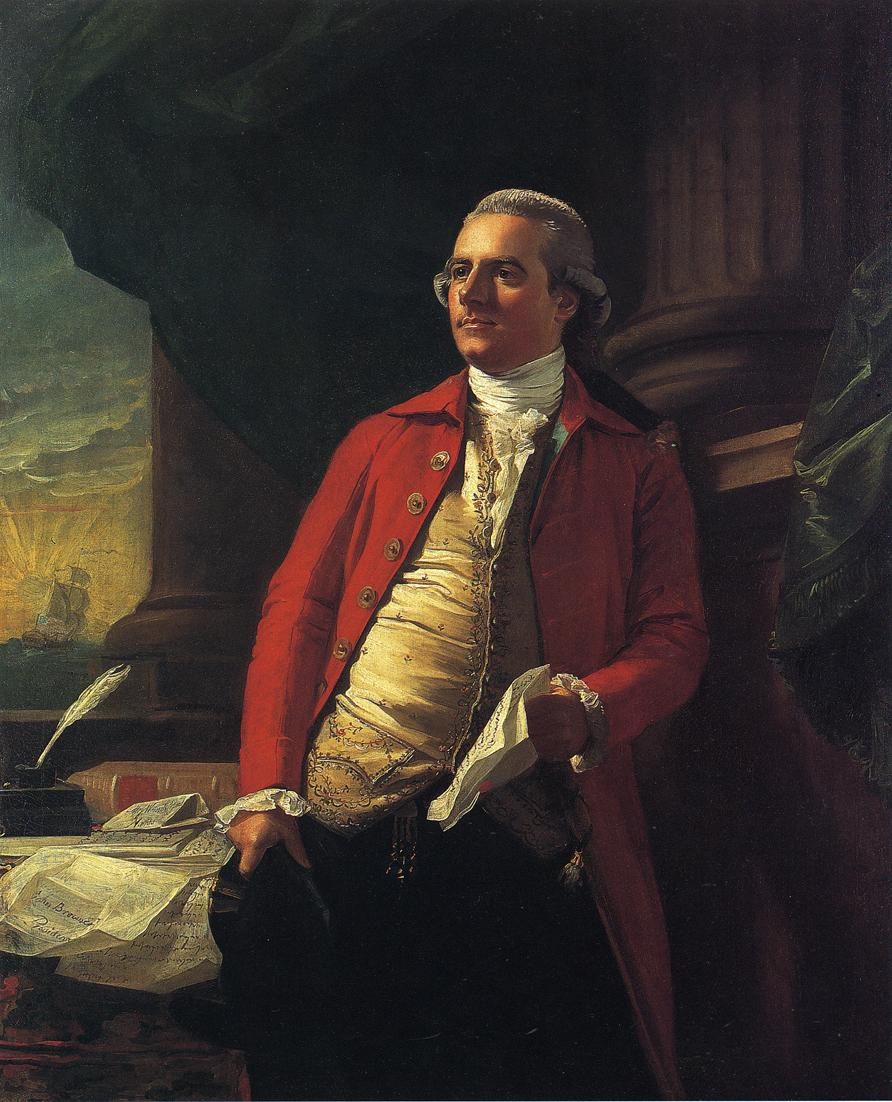
John Singleton Copley, Elkanah Watson, 1782. The ship in the background represents the departure to America of the acknowledgement of the independence of the United States.

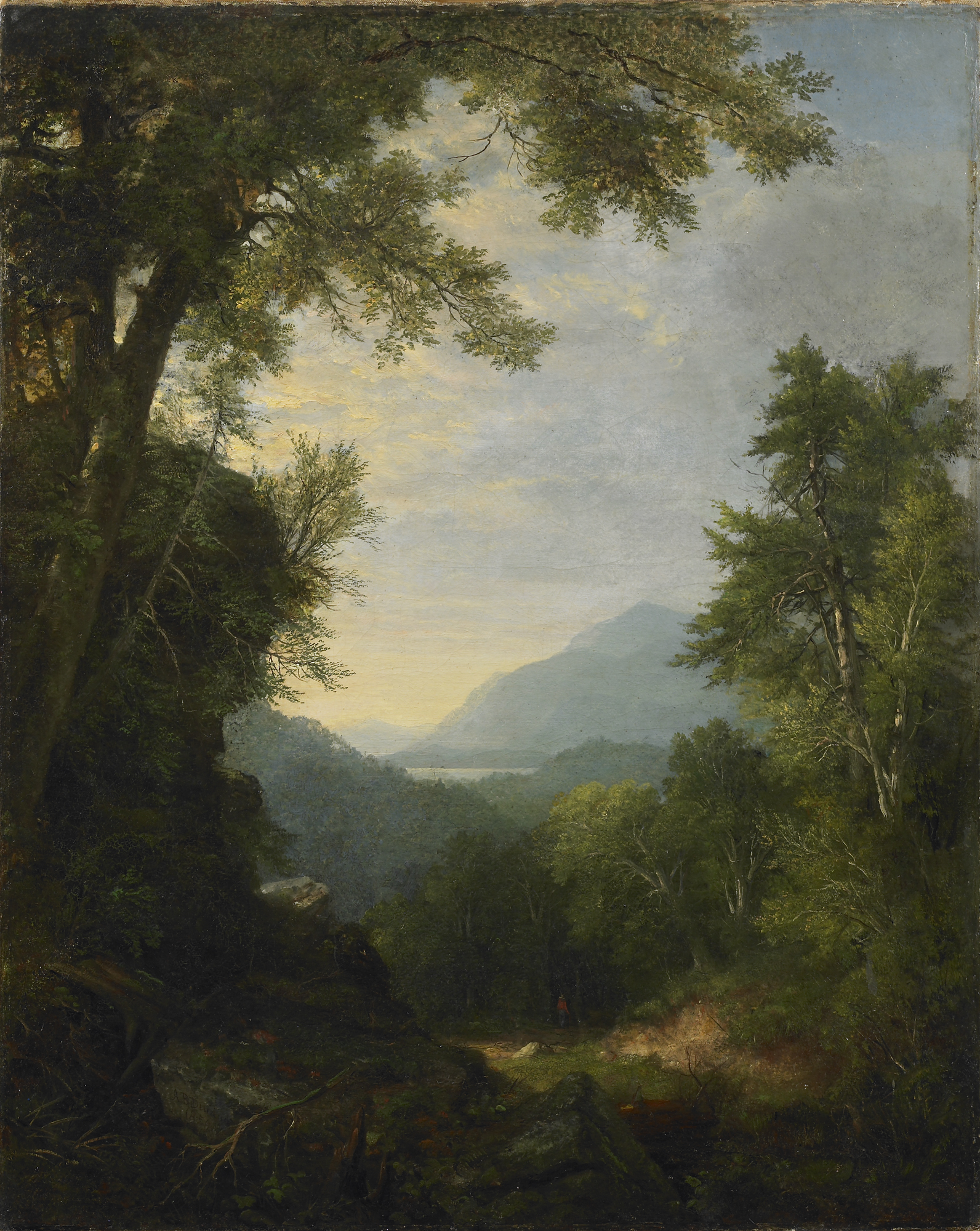
Asher Brown Durand, Landscape, 1859, part of the Hudson River School

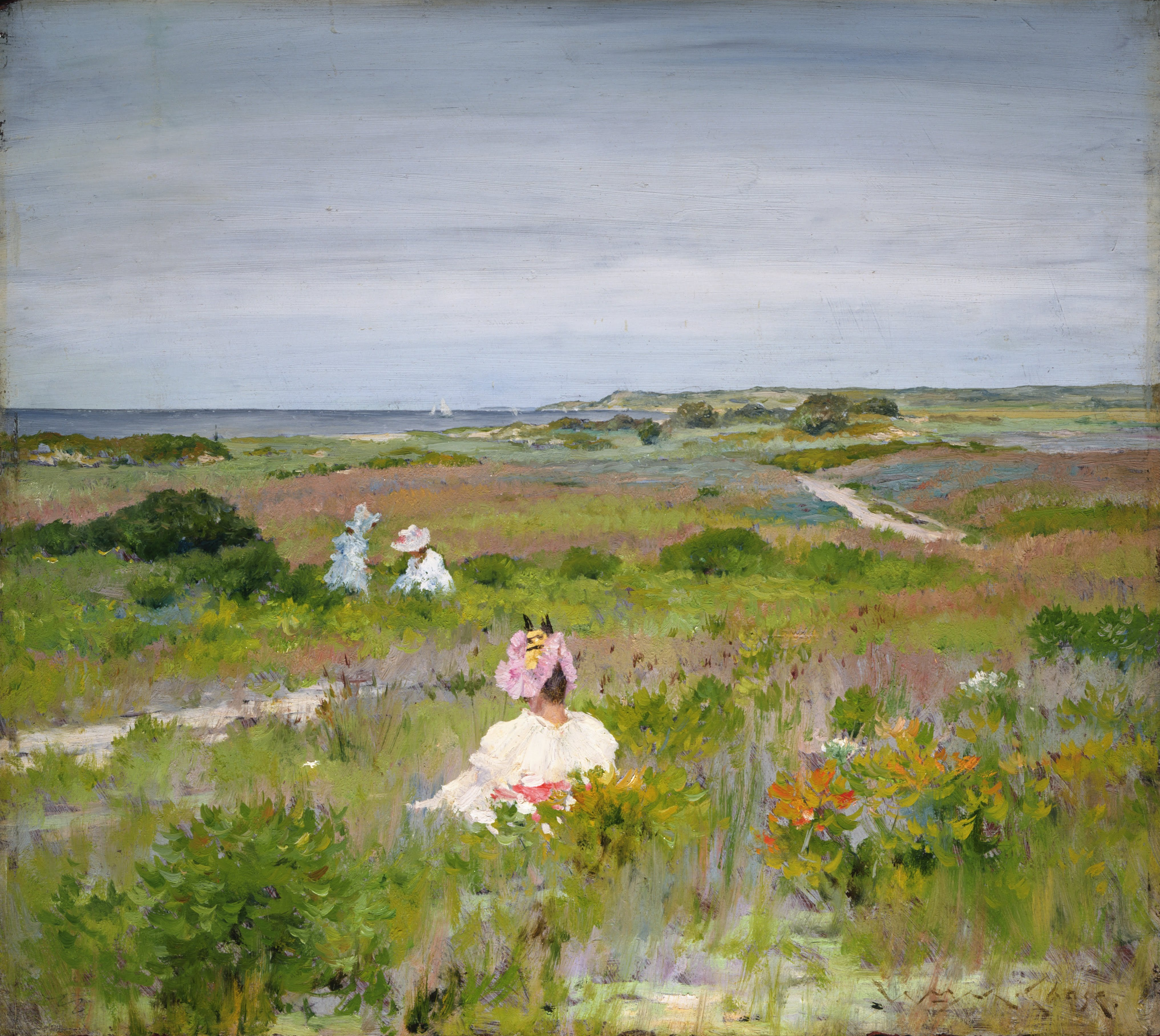
William Merritt Chase, Landscape: Shinnecock, Long Island, ca. 1896

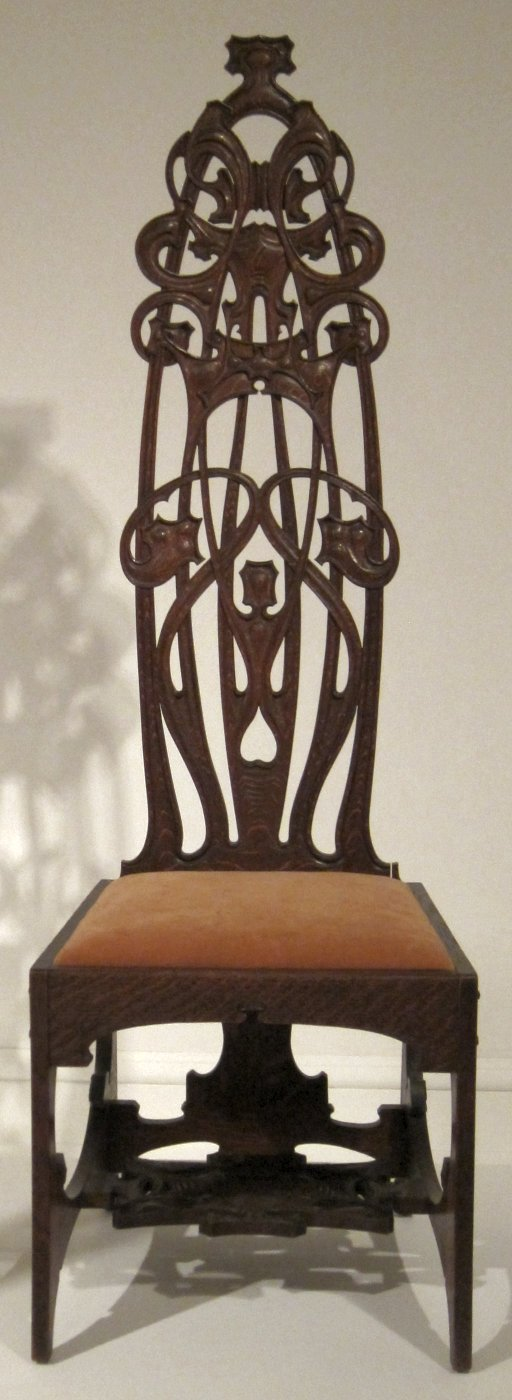
Charles Rohlfs, Tall Back Chair, ca. 1898–99

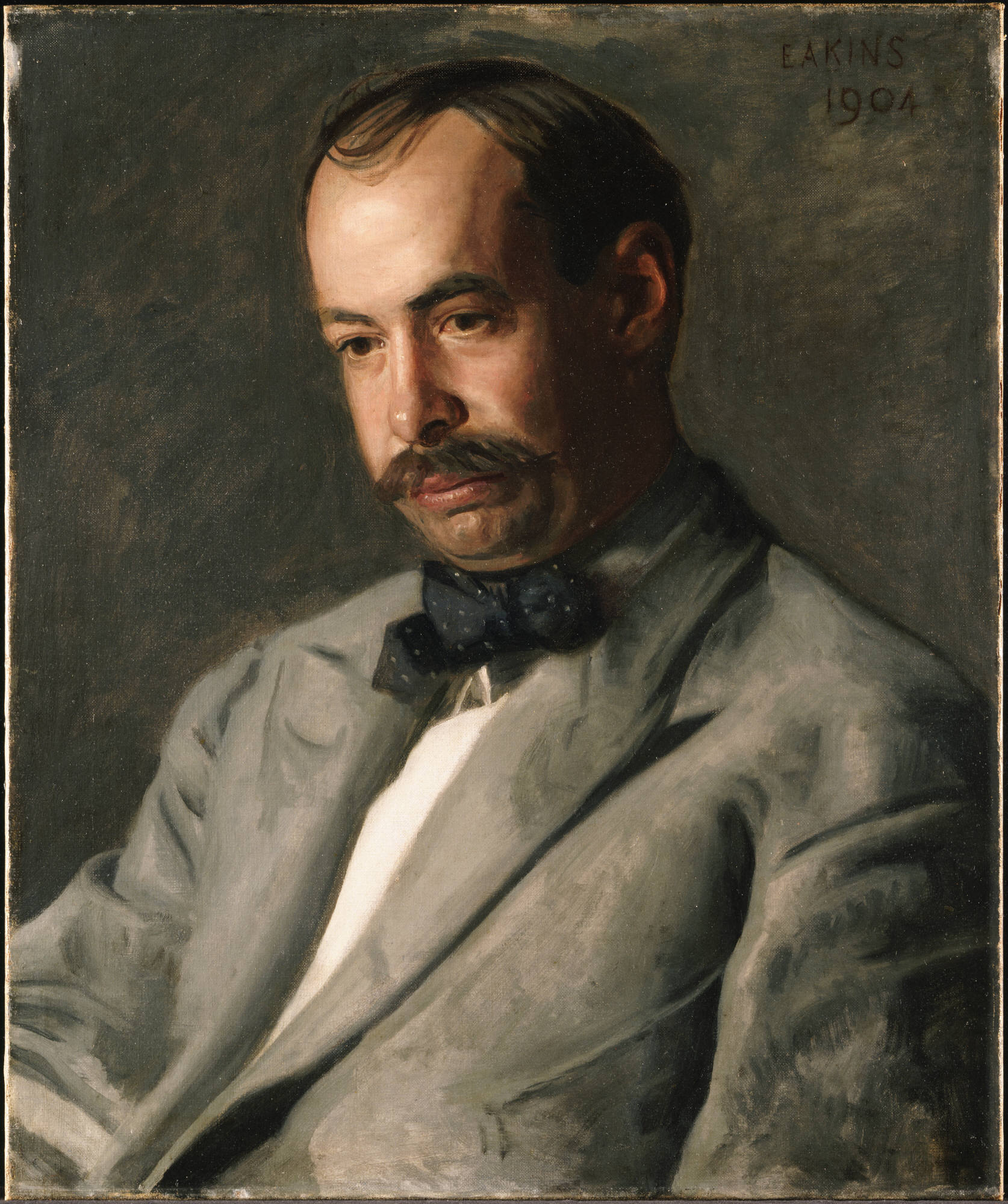
Thomas Eakins, Portrait of Charles Percival Buck, 1904

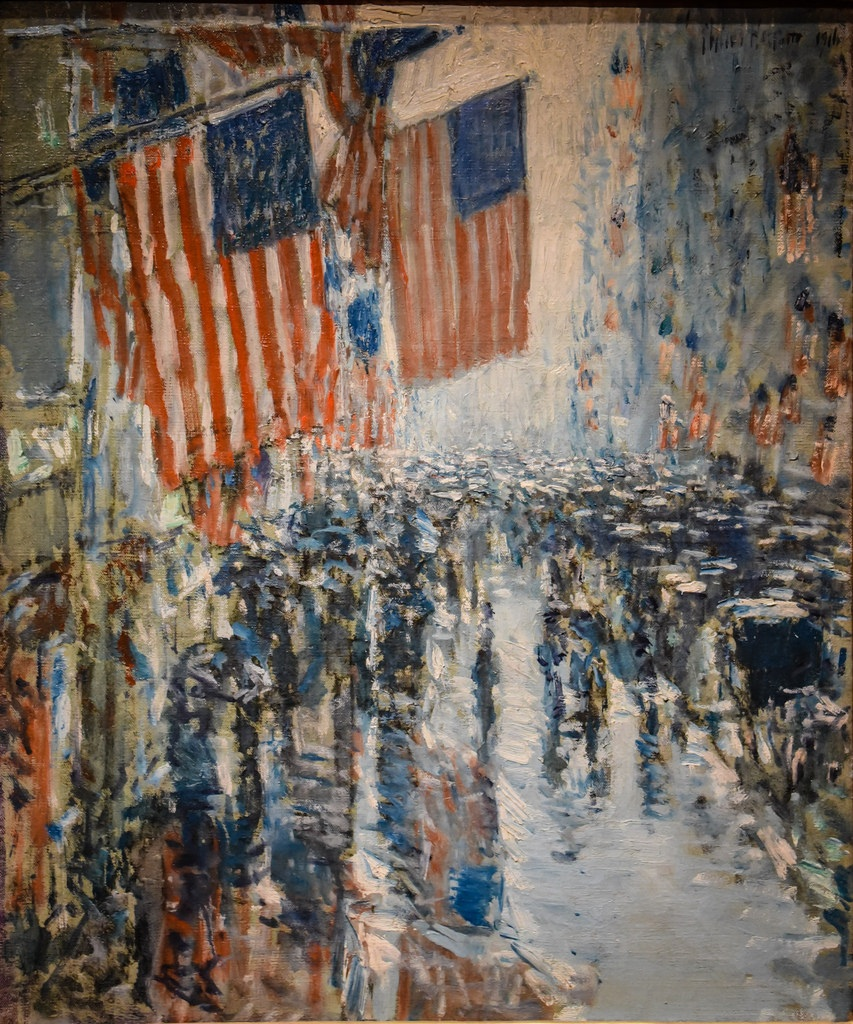
Childe Hassam, Rainy Day, Fifth Avenue, 1916, part of his Flag series

=== Ancient, Byzantine, and Islamic art ===
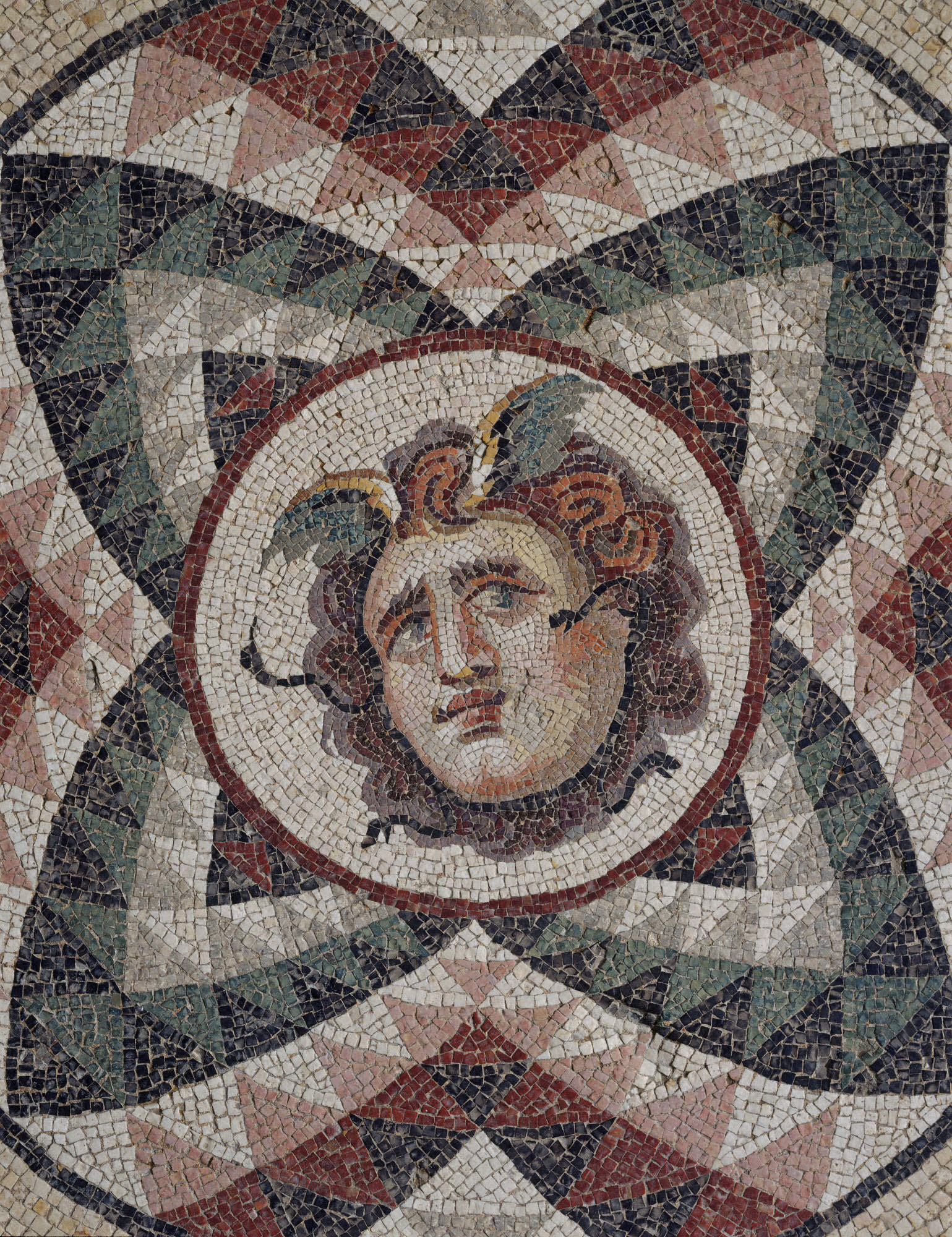
Roman, Antioch, mosaic pavement, head of Medusa, late 2nd century A.D.

Ancient art has played a central role in the museum's collection since its beginning. The first major addition to the collection included many Etruscan vases, as well as those from Egypt, Greece, and Rome. There are now more than 5,000 objects in the collection, documenting the early civilizations of Mesopotamia, Iran, Asia Minor, and the Levant. The great diversity of artifacts also covers the various eras of ancient Egypt, from pottery to stone reliefs, amulets, wall paintings, bronze statuettes, and mummies. The Greek collection includes significant works of both black-figure and red-figure pottery, including the vase used to identify the Princeton Painter. It spans the broad range of artistic work, from Archaic bronze statuettes to terracotta figurines, jewelry to funerary reliefs, pottery from Rhodes, Cyprus, and Corinth.

Ancient Italy is in particular well represented in the collection, from the Etruscan vases, metalwork, and sculptures to a great breadth of Roman antiquities. The Roman collection includes portraits, sculptures, sarcophagi, carved bone, coins, statuettes, and a spectacular silver-gilt wine cup. The university's heritage of archaeological work in Roman Syria has left a legacy of basalt sculptures from Hauran, funerary reliefs from Palmyra, and a renowned collection of Antioch mosaics.

Byzantine and Islamic art are an equally esteemed focus of the collection, with icons and jewelry from Constantinople sharing a gallery with pottery, metalwork, and glazed tiles from Egypt, Syria, and Iran.

Media related to Ancient, Byzantine, and Islamic art in the Princeton University Art Museum at Wikimedia Commons

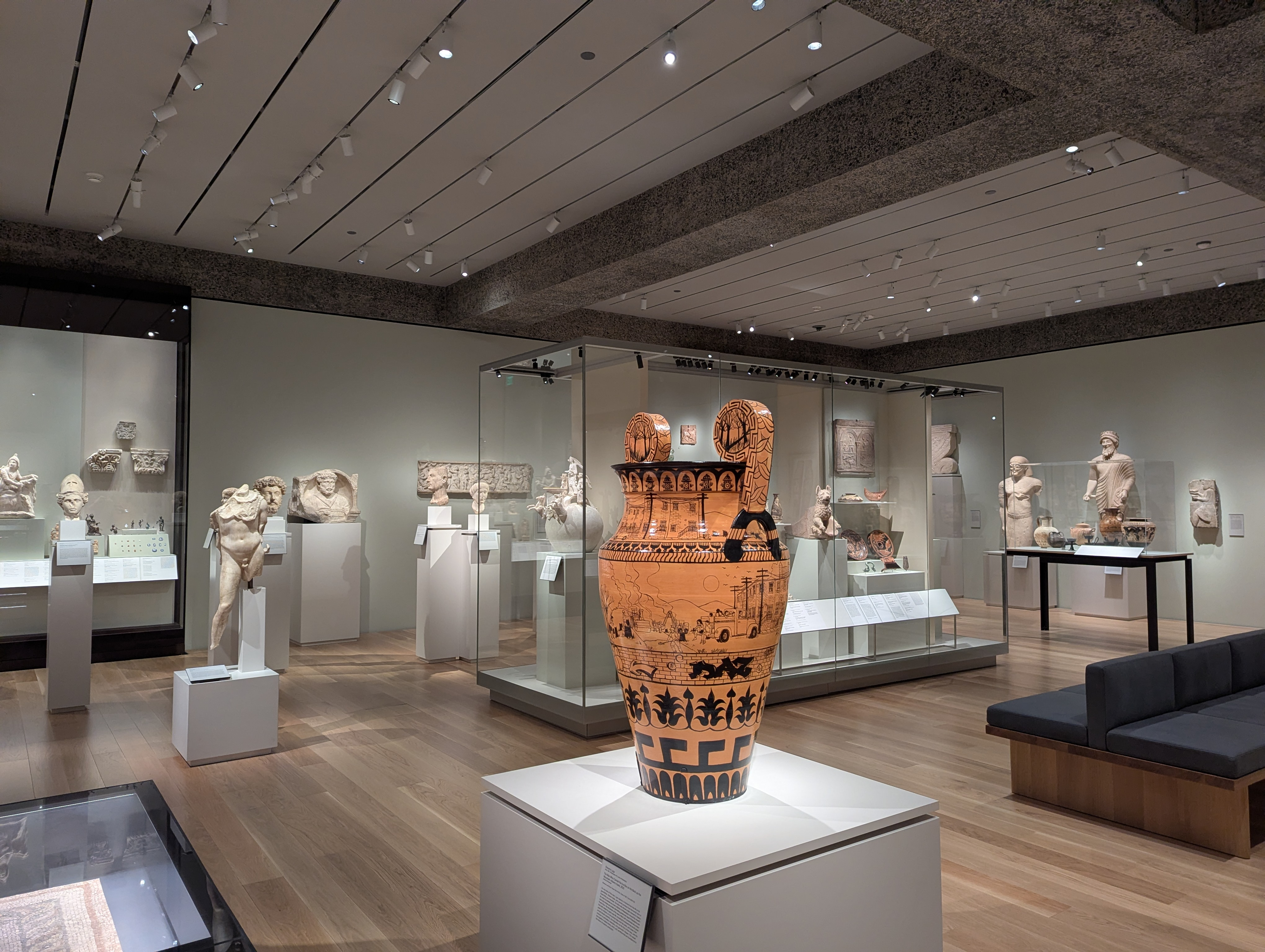
The Ancient Mediterranean Art Gallery in the new museum

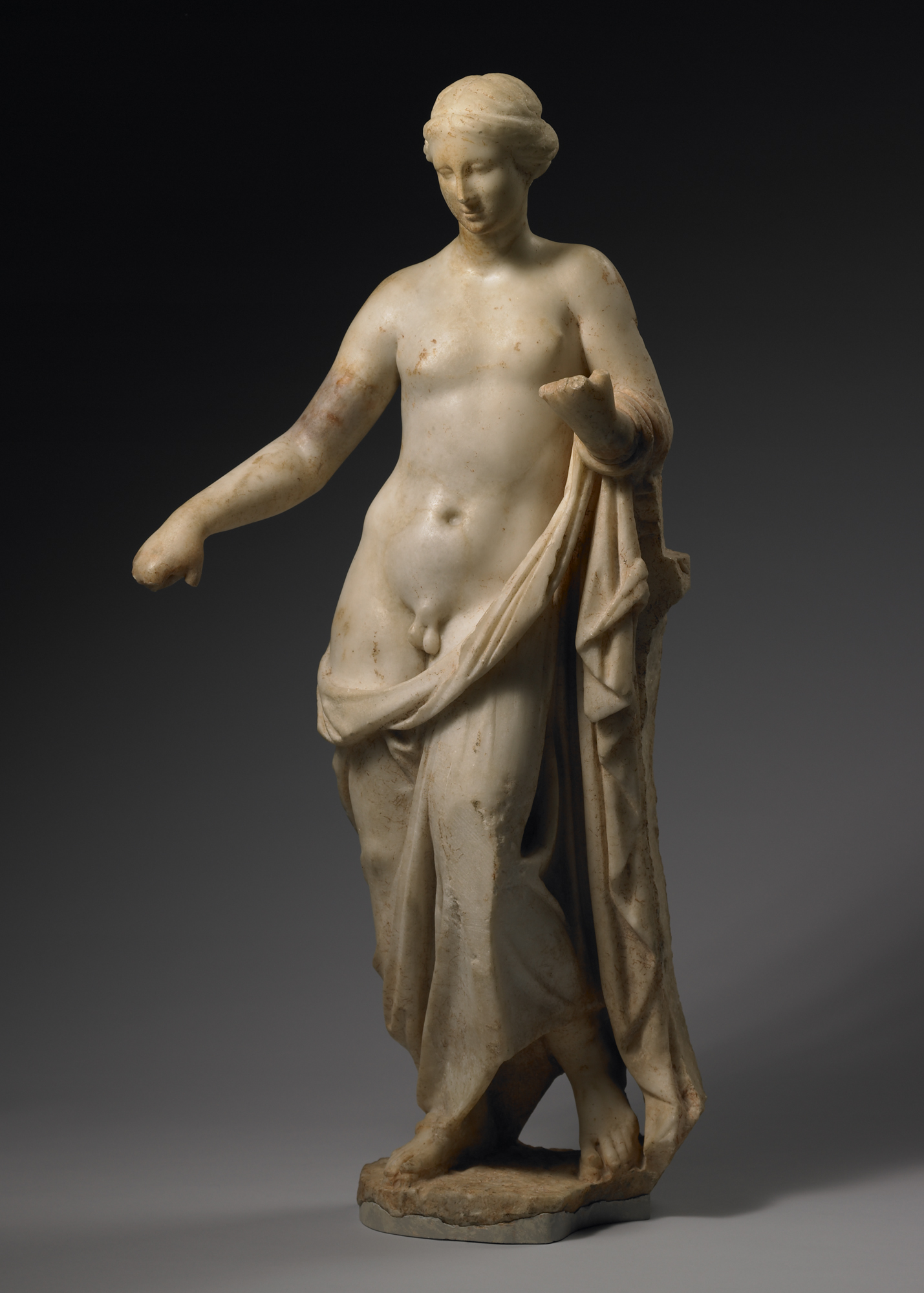
Greek, Hellenistic, Statuette of Hermaphrodite, 2nd century B.C.

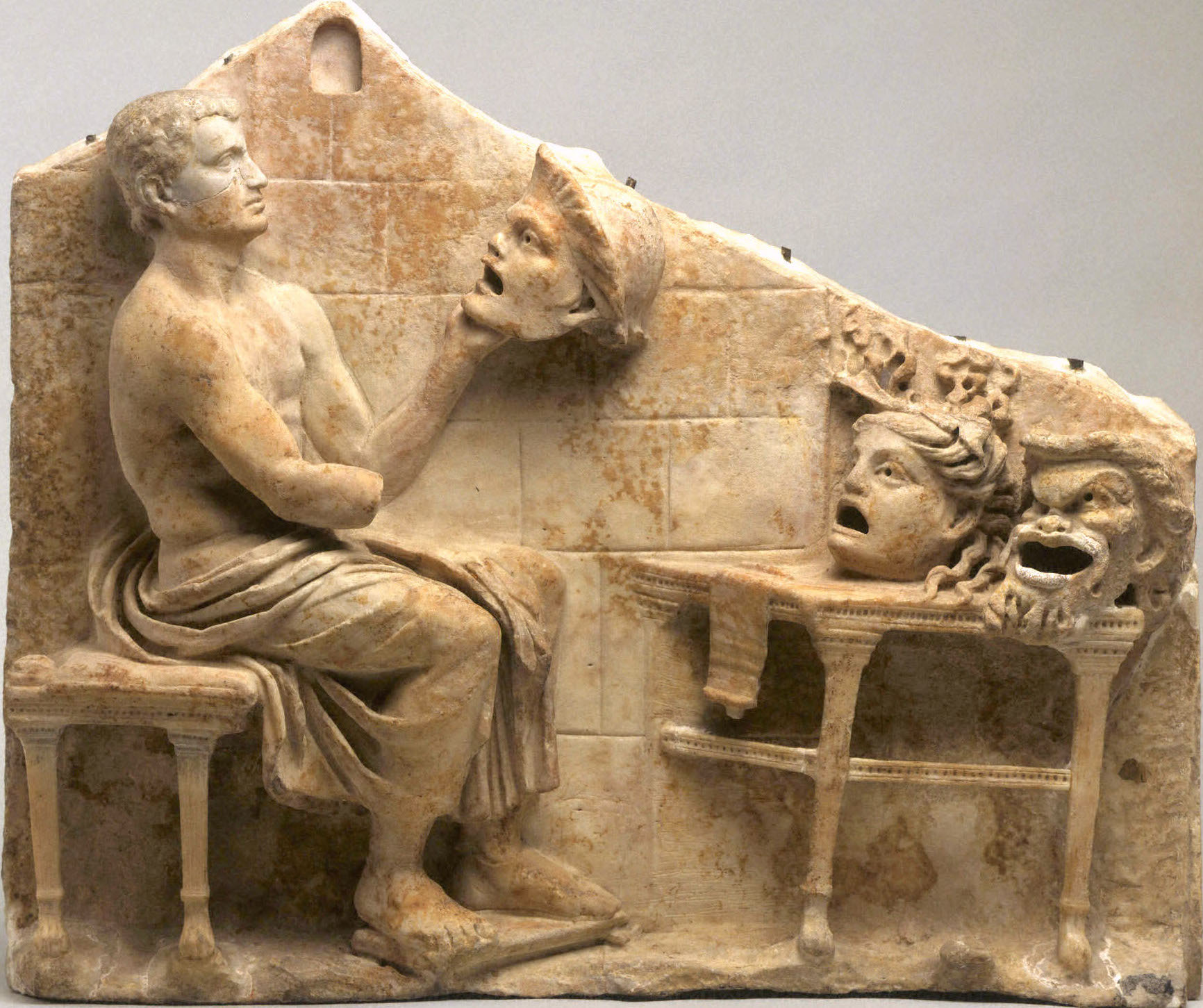
Roman, Republican or Early Imperial, Relief of a seated poet (Menander) with masks of New Comedy, 1st century B.C. – early 1st century A.D.

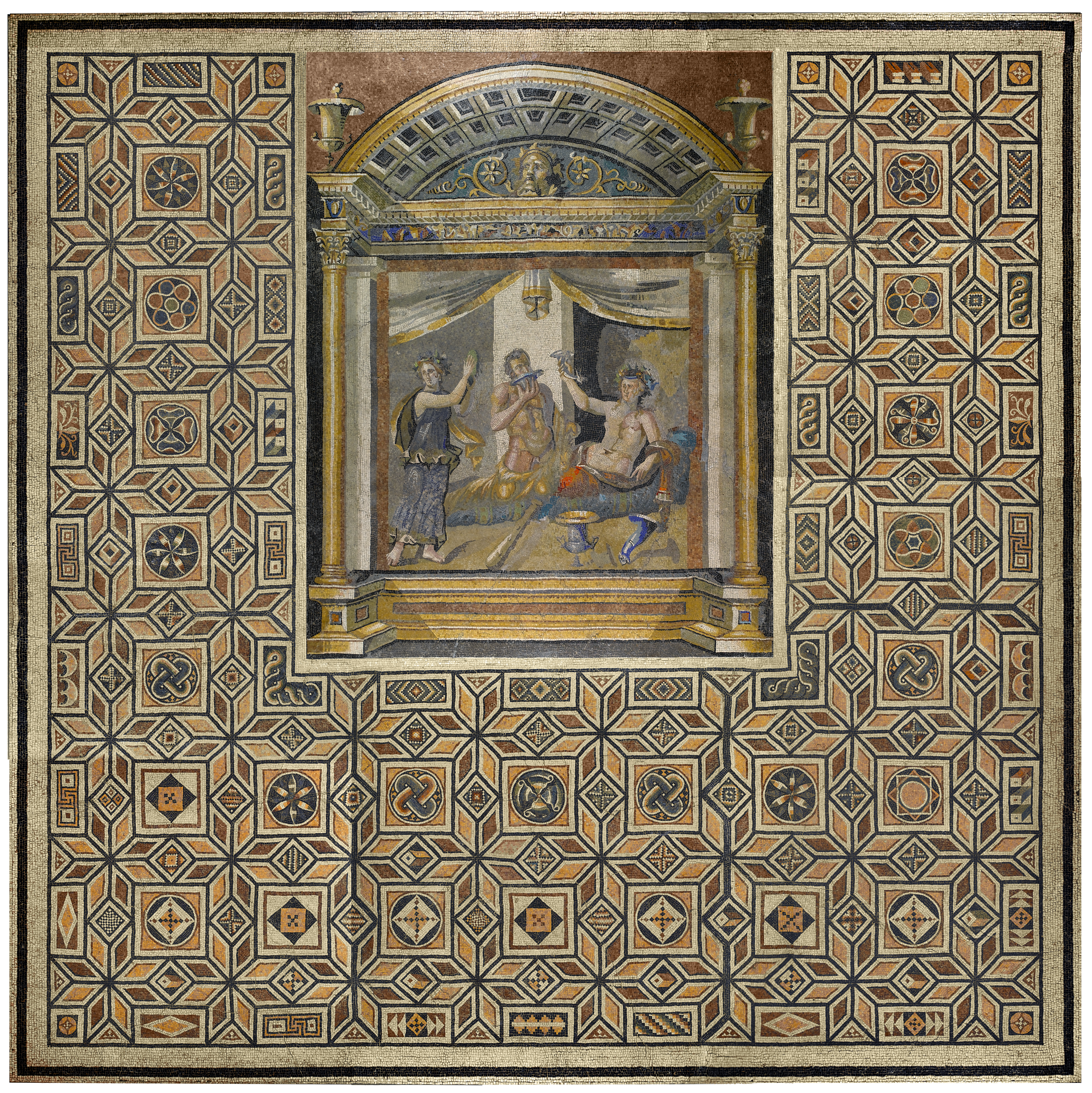
Roman, Antioch, mosaic pavement, Drinking contest of Herakles and Dionysos, early 3rd century A.D.

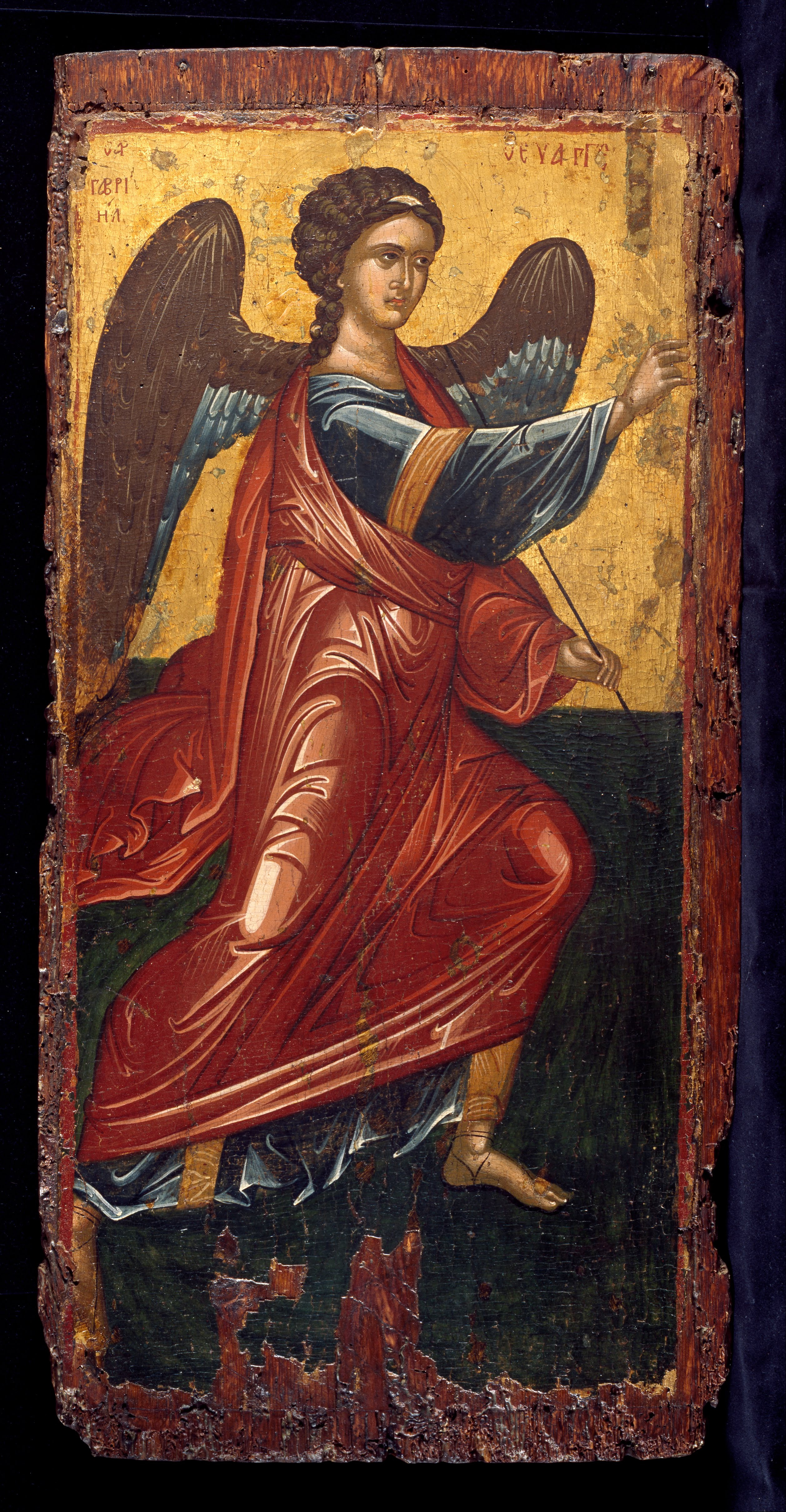
Greek, Late Byzantine, The Archangel Gabriel, from an Annunciation scene on the King's Door of an iconostasis, second half of the 15th century

=== Pre-Columbian art ===
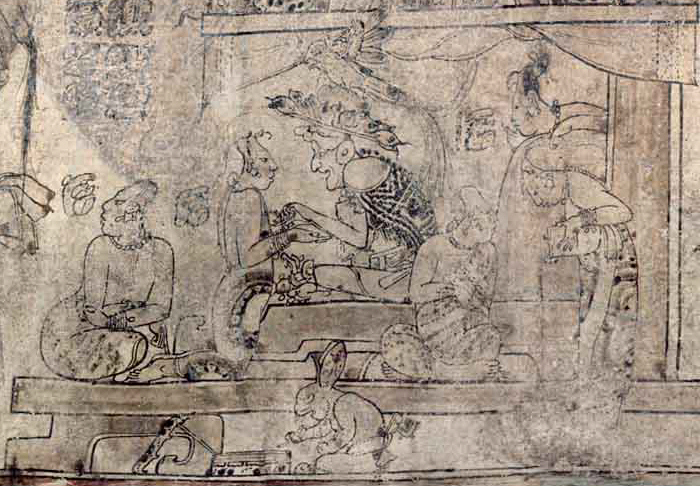
late Classic, Maya ('Codex' style), The Princeton Vase, A.D. 670–750

The collection of the art of the ancient Americas includes objects covering five thousand years of history, from the Arctic to Chile. The collection's primary focus is on small, portable works of art, typically ceramic or stone. Of particular note are the more than twenty prized polychrome ceramic works, the Classic Mayan Princeton Vase, and over thirty ceramic figurines, from the lowland Maya region. The collection of Olmec objects comprises smaller jade, serpentine, and ceramic works. Of the collection's works from South America, the most notable are those from the Mochica culture, which flourished in Peru between 200 B.C. and A.D. 700. The museum's holdings in Native American art include important collections of Arctic Walrus carvings, art of the Tlingit people, and a growing representation from the Mississippi Valley and the American Southwest.

The collection of Pre-Columbian works began in the 19th century through the efforts of the Reverend Sheldon Jackson, an 1855 graduate of the Princeton Theological Seminary. He donated a collection of Native American ethnographic objects to the Seminary, which transferred them to the university's E. M. Museum of Geology and Archaeology, then in 1909 to the Guyot Hall Museum, which, after its closure in 2000, gave them to the Art Museum. As with the art of Africa and Oceania, Indigenous American art was not a focus of the museum's historic collecting. Nonetheless, objects were steadily donated during the early decades of the museum, including in the Trumbull-Prime Collection and the donations of Frank Jewett Mather Jr. The collection of ancient American art received its proper attention following the 1967 appointment of Gillett G. Griffin as faculty curator, a position he held until 2004. The current collection is largely the result of his efforts, both through his own collections and his influence on donors.

Media related to Art of the Ancient Americas in the Princeton University Art Museum at Wikimedia Commons

=== Asian art ===
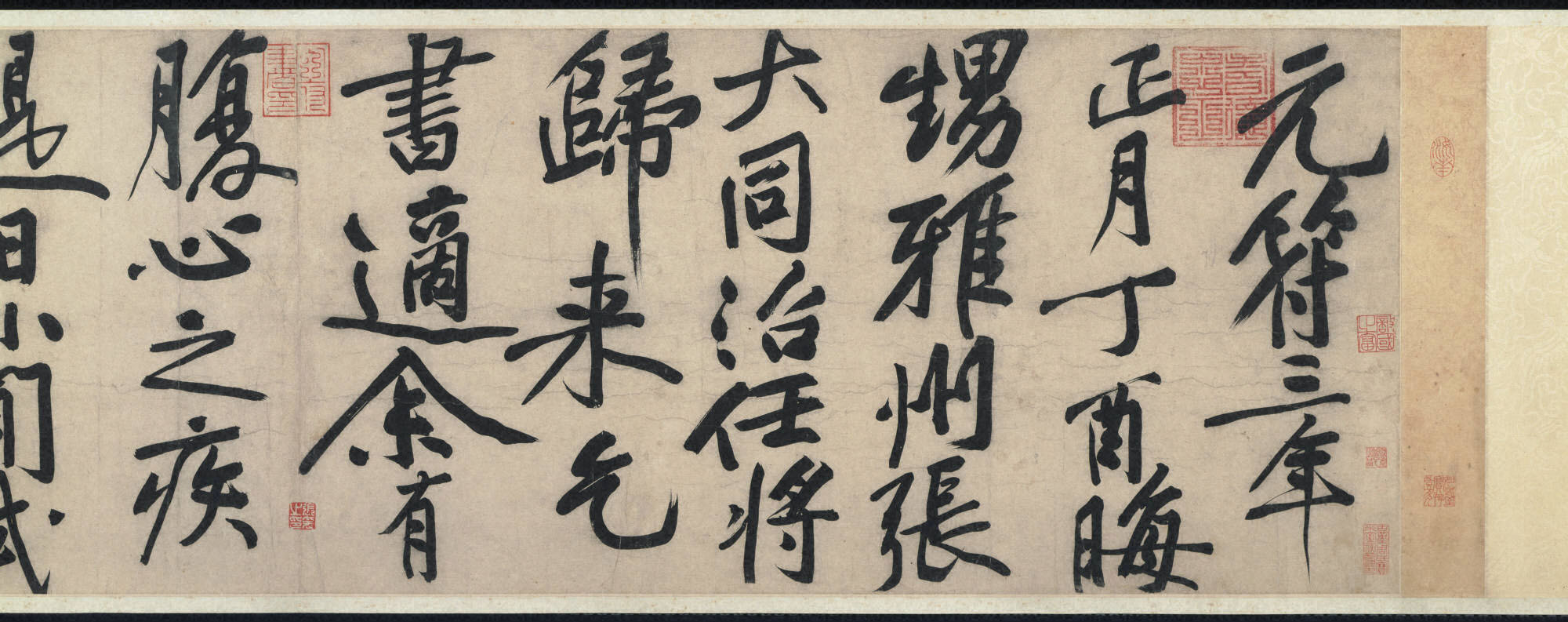
Huang Tingjian, Scroll for Zhang Datong, A.D. 1100, a canonical work of Chinese calligraphy

The collection of Asian art began with the foundation of the museum, with the primary focus for the early decades being Japanese art. Major collections of Chinese art were incorporated in the 1930s and 40s, including the snuff bottle collection of James A. Blair. Dubois Schanck Morris presented his collection of 460 paintings in 1947. The late 1950s brought significant additions of Chinese ritual bronzes and archaeological artifacts from J. Lionberger Davis, Class of 1900, as well as acquisitions from the Chester Dale and Dolly Carter Collection.

The primary strengths of the museum's collection are in Chinese and Japanese art, including Neolithic jade and pottery, ritual bronze vesslels, lacquerware, ceramics, sculpture and metalware, and woodblock prints. The museum's collection of calligraphy and painting is among the finest outside of Asia, including rare masterpieces from the Song and Yuan dynasties such as Huang Tingjian's Scroll for Zhang Datong. The collection also has significant holdings in Korean art, including a growing collection of artifacts ranging from the Three Kingdoms period to the Joseon dynasty. The art of India, Gandhara, Southeast Asia, and Central Asia are also represented, with the influence of Islam and Hinduism on the artistic traditions of the subcontinent represented through sculpture, statuettes, and painted miniatures.

Media related to Asian art in the Princeton University Art Museum at Wikimedia Commons

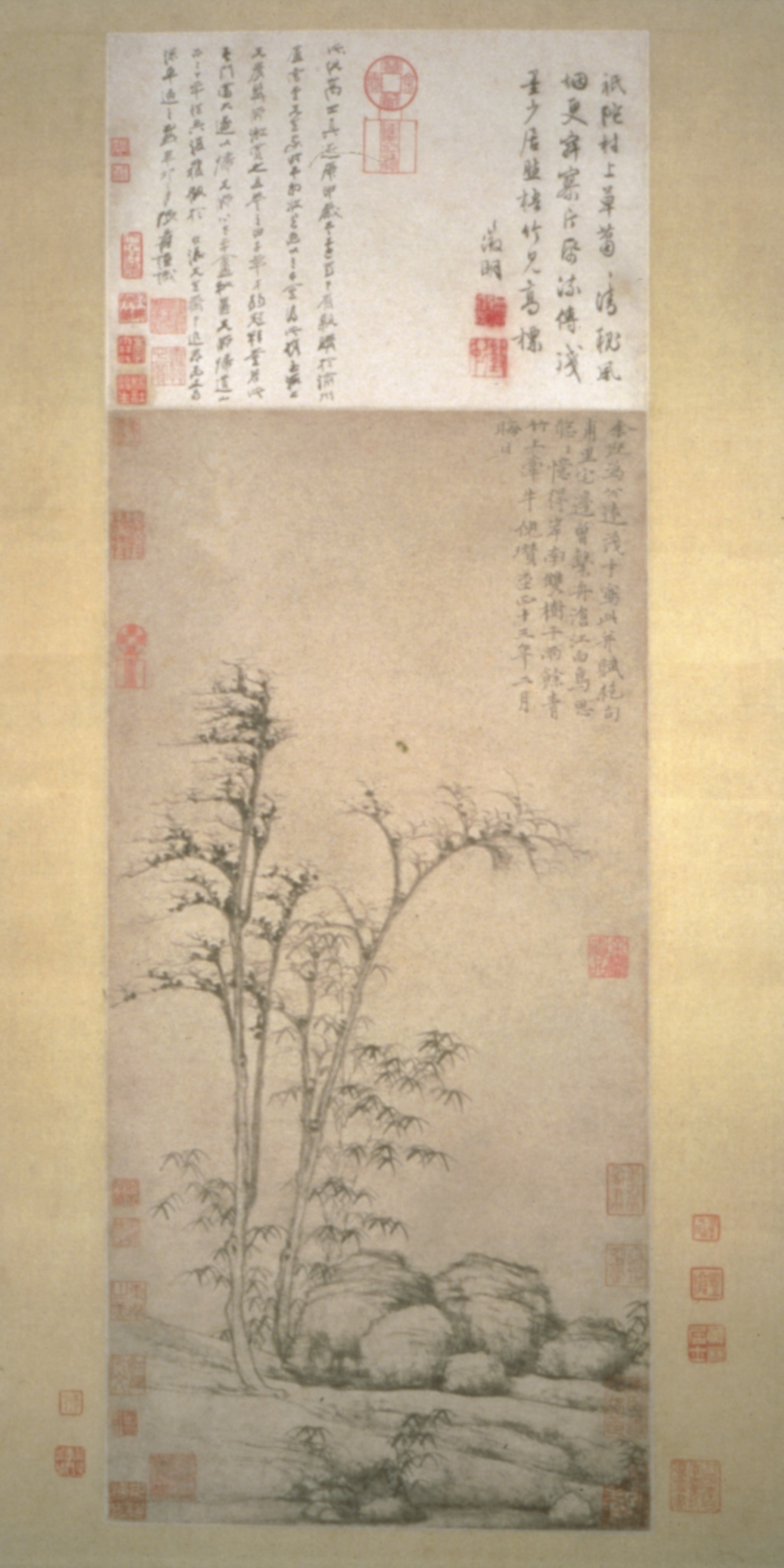
Ni Zan(倪瓚), Twin Trees by the South Bank (Annan shuangshu), 1353

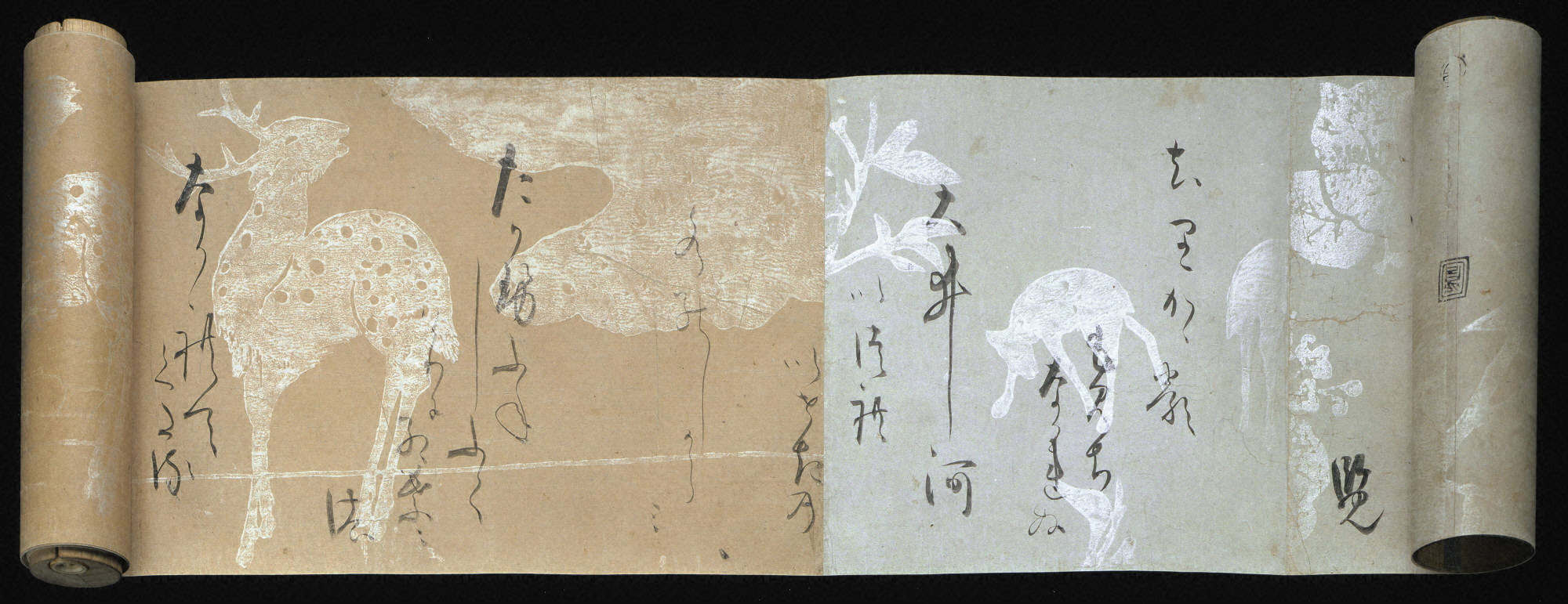
Hon'ami Kōetsu, Selections from the New Collection of Japanese Poems from Ancient and Modern Times (Shinkokin wakashū) with Printed Designs of Plants and Animals, before 1615

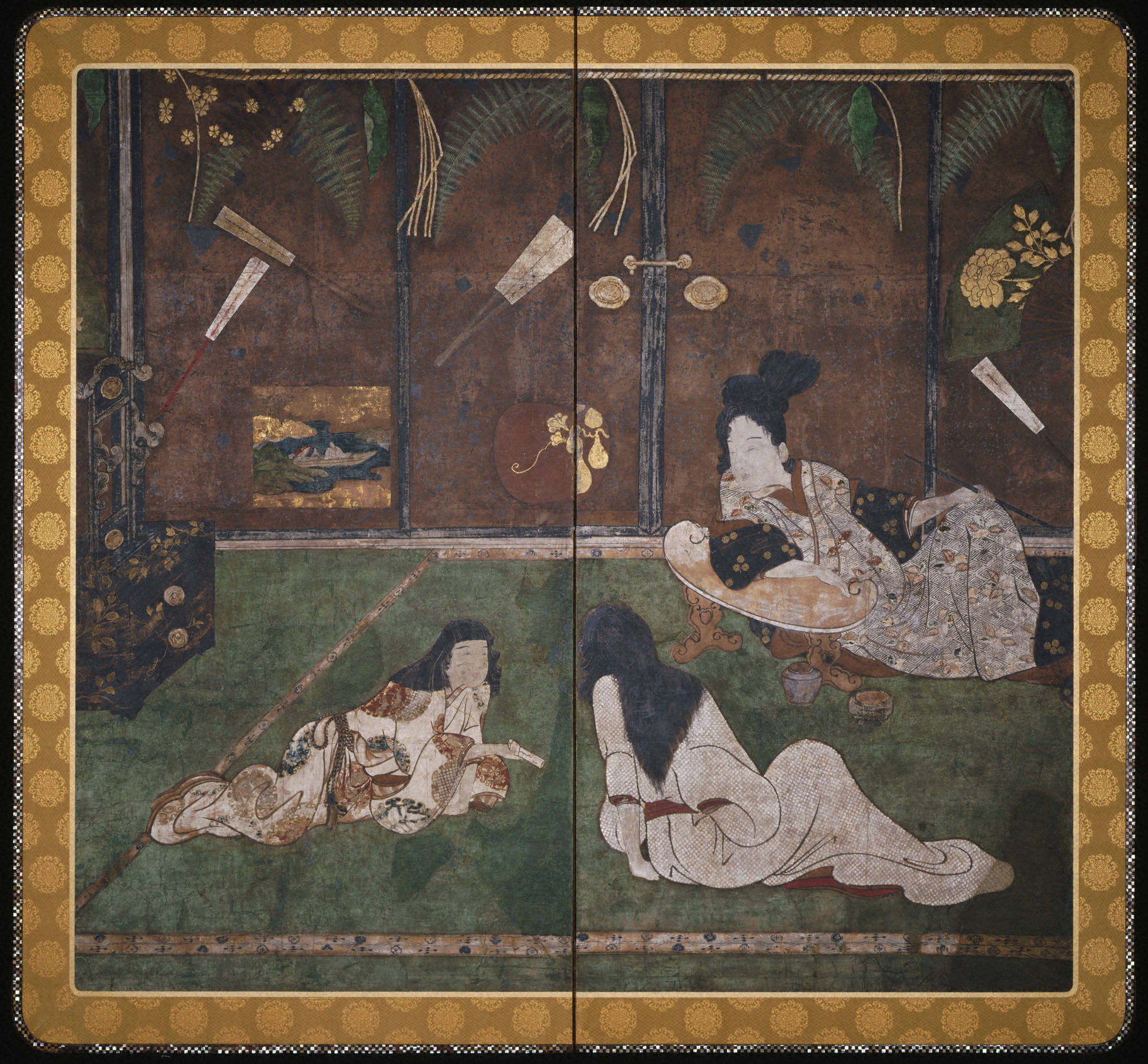
Japanese, Messenger of Love (Fumitsukai byōbu-e), 1624 - 1644

=== Campus Collections ===
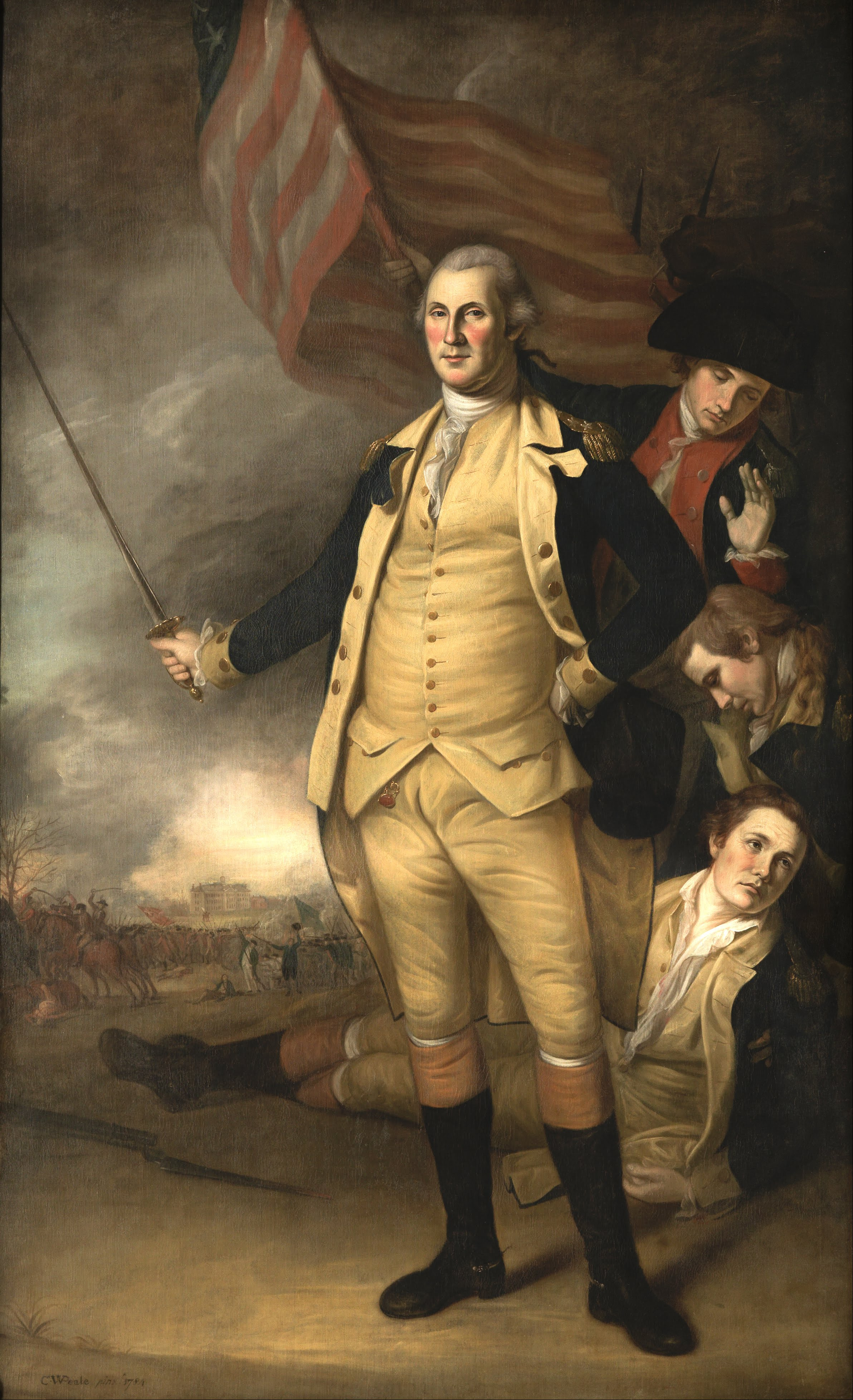
Charles Willson Peale, George Washington at the Battle of Princeton, 1784

The Campus Collections comprise the multitude of paintings, sculptures, memorials, and monuments significant to the university's history and traditions. Central to the collection are the Princeton Portraits, numbering more than 600 paintings and sculptures which depict figures prominent in the history of the university. The portraits span the breadth of American history, including the landmark portrait, George Washington at the Battle of Princeton, by Charles Willson Peale. Washington himself provided the funds for the work. Another highlight is the series of paintings by renowned sculpture and natural history artist Benjamin Waterhouse Hawkins which depict dinosaurs and other prehistoric fauna. The series was commissioned by Princeton president James McCosh in 1876 as a progressive response to Charles Darwin's theories.

The collection is also home to the celebrated Putnam Collection, which comprises 22 works by master artists of the 20th and 21st centuries. The collection was the result of an anonymous donation in honor of a Princeton alumnus who died in World War II. It is commonly regarded as one of the greatest collections of public art, providing a plein-air lesson in art history. Among the highlights of the collection are Oval with Points by Henry Moore and Five Disks: One Empty by Alexander Calder, whose father, A. Stirling Calder, had previously created a statue of Saint George and the Dragon on Princeton's Henry Hall. Calder's work was responsible for an accident during its installation where two men were killed after the sculpture was dropped on them due to a crane collapse. Another highlight of the Putnam collection is Pablo Picasso's Head of a Woman, which was designed by Picasso in 1962, though assembled by Carl Nesjar in 1971.

Media related to Campus Collections of Princeton University at Wikimedia Commons

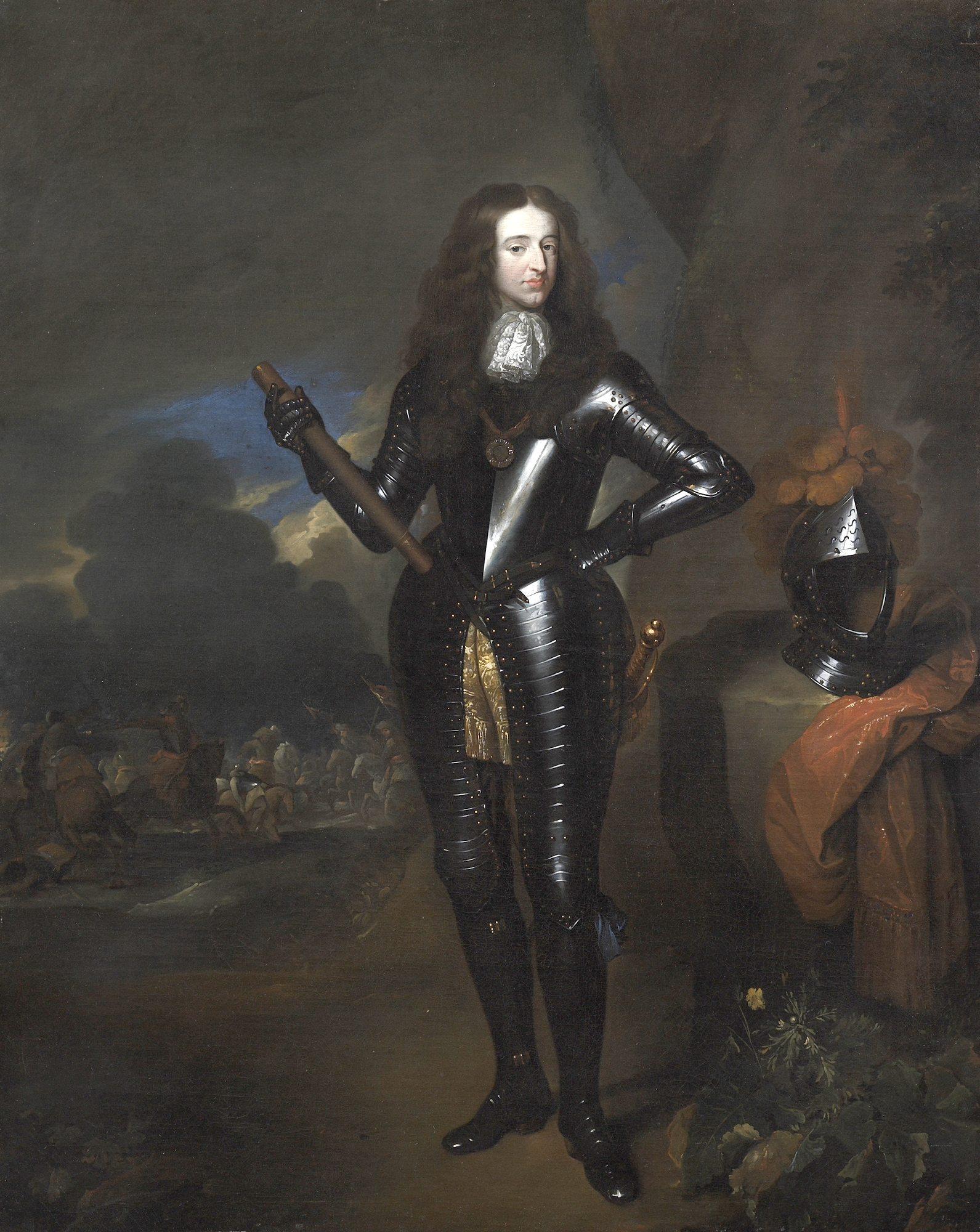
Caspar Netscher, William III, King of England, Prince of Orange and Nassau (1650–1702), ca. 1672–89, after whom the name Nassau Hall and the color orange to represent Princeton were chosen

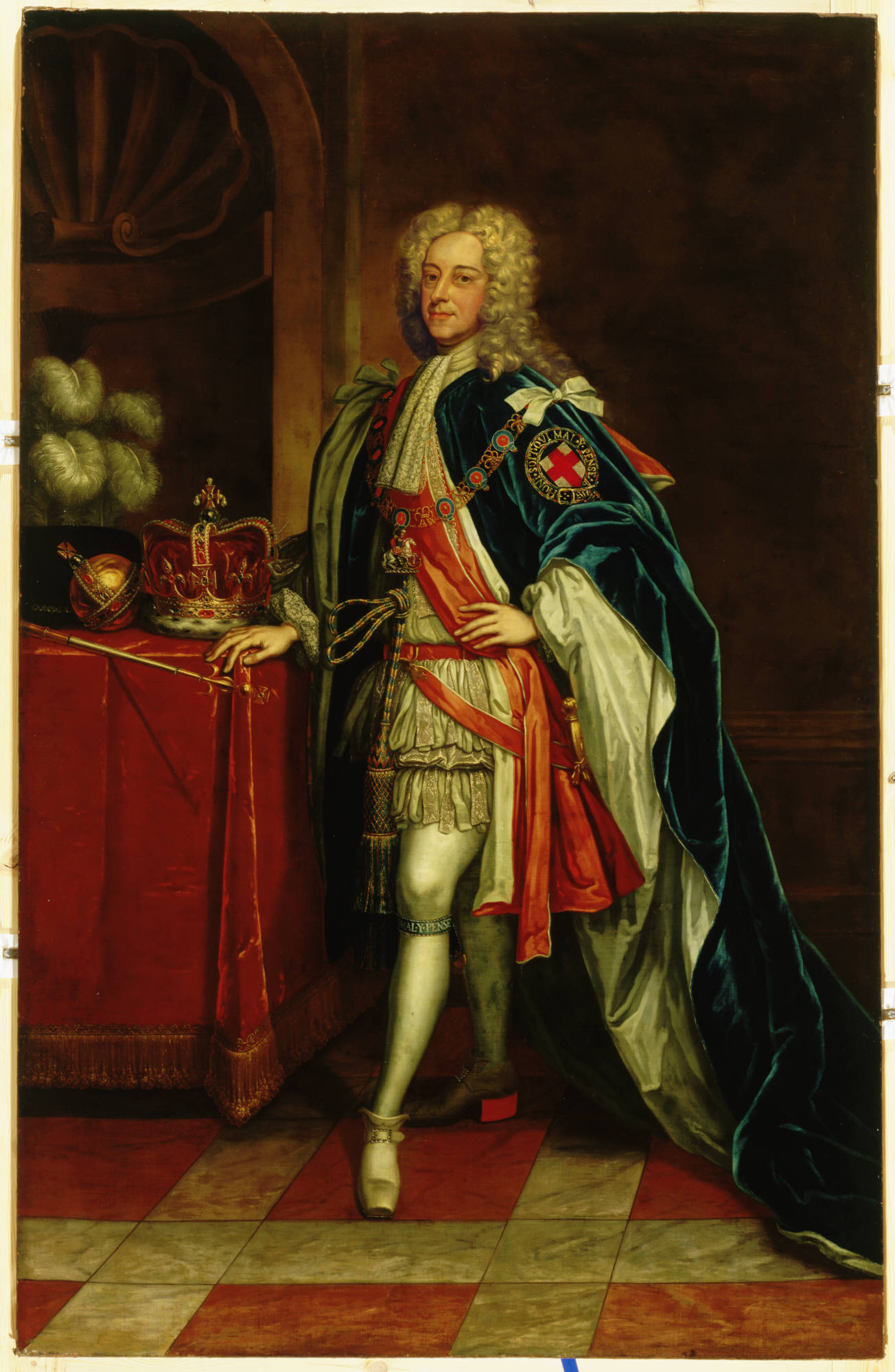
After Sir Godfrey Kneller, George II, King of England (1683-1760), ca. 1727–32, the monarch who issued the letters patent establishing the College of New Jersey, now Princeton University

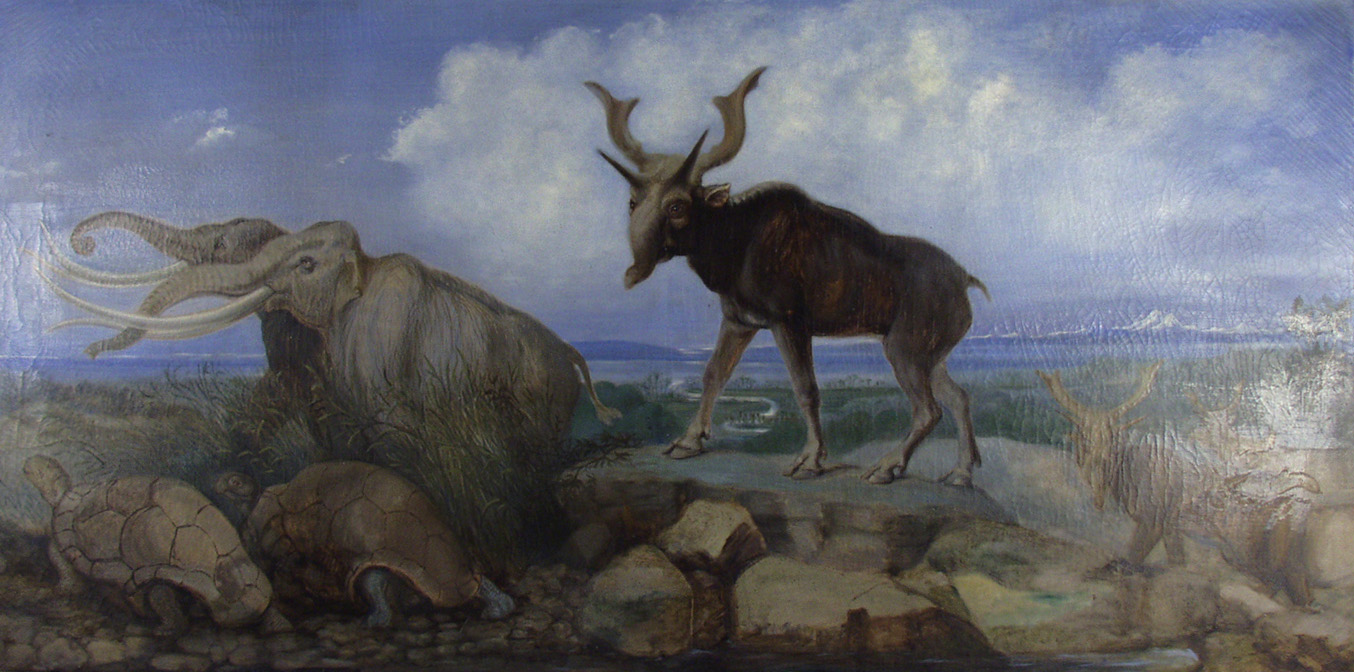
Benjamin Waterhouse Hawkins, Pleistocene Fauna of Asia, 1876, part of the series commissioned by James McCosh in response to the new theory of evolution

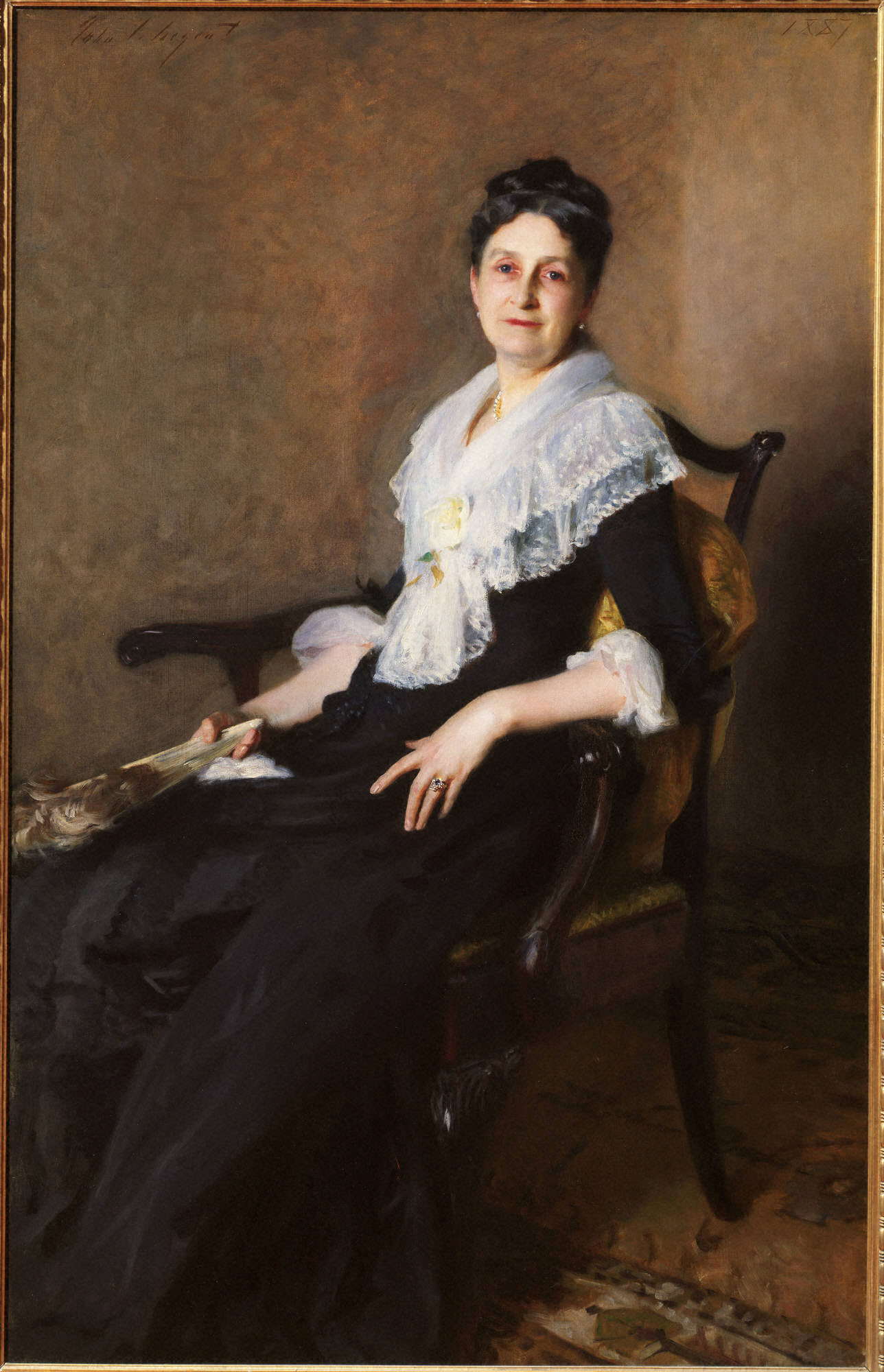
John Singer Sargent, Elizabeth Allen Marquand, 1887, mother of the museum's first director, Allan Marquand

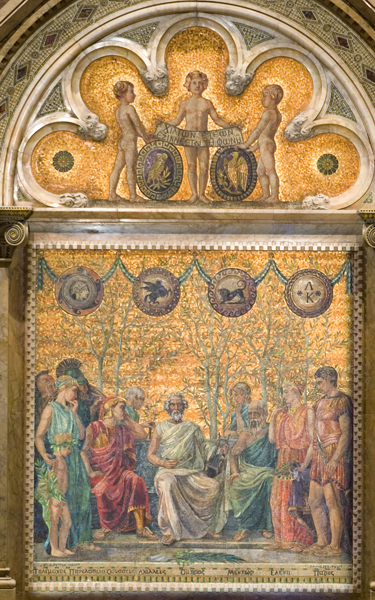
Jacob Adolphus Holzer, Homeric Story, 1894, center detail of the mosaic in Alexander Hall, depicting Homer seated at center with Mentor, Helen, and Paris on the right and Telemachus, Penelope, Odysseus, and Achilles on the left

=== European art ===
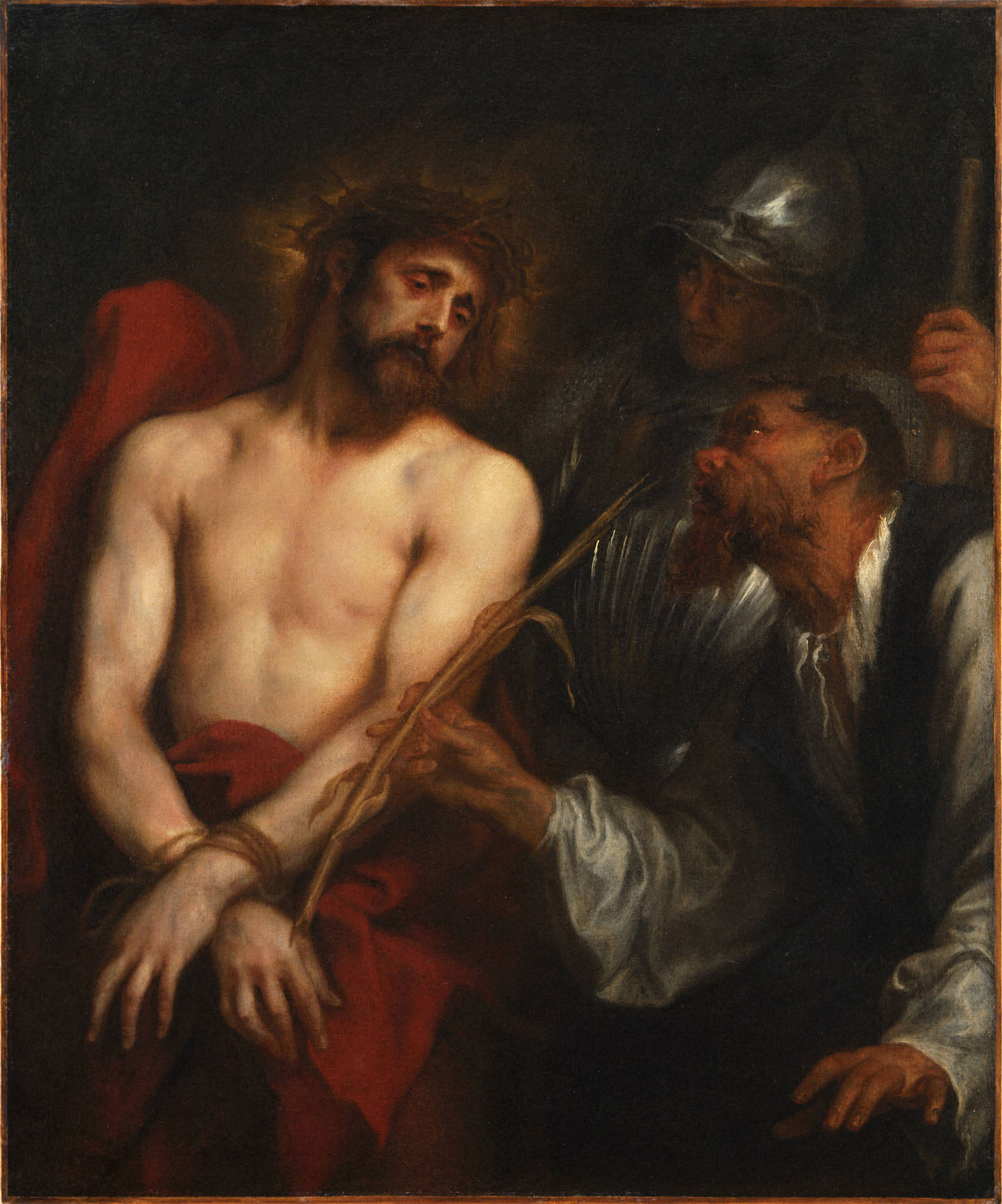
Anthony van Dyck, The Mocking of Christ, 1628-30

The collection of European art covers nearly nine hundred years, from the twelfth century to the 20th. The strengths of the museum's holdings within this broad spectrum often reflect the Department of Art and Archaeology's curriculum, though with many unexpected treasures, due to the interests of donors.

The collection of medieval art is primarily the result of museum purchases, demonstrating the techniques and materials of artists, as well as the secular and spiritual uses of their work. Among the collection of stained glass is a window from Chartres Cathedral, and the collection of medieval sculpture includes a gisant of a Spanish knight. Other strengths are polychrome sculpture from Spain and Germany; French, German, and Italian metalwork; and enamels and ivories from France.

Notable in the early modern collection are the rare thirteenth- and fourteenth-century Italian gold-ground paintings from Siena including works by Fra Angelico, Francesco Traini, and Guido da Siena. The museum is home to an unusual group of Dutch Mannerist paintings from around 1600, including works by Hendrik Goltzius and Abraham Bloemaert, the richest of its kind in an American museum. Baroque art is represented by Pietro da Cortona and Giovanni Battista Gaulli. Notable rococo masters include Jean-Siméon Chardin and François Boucher. Age of Enlightenment paintings include works by Angelica Kauffman, Francisco de Goya, and the studio of Jacques-Louis David.

The nineteenth-century collection consists of works from the Age of Revolution and Industrial Age which trace academic traditions and preparatory processes. Themes represented include the rise of Landscape painting, the human figure, the collecting of small sculpture, and the successive cultural and stylistic waves—revival styles, Orientalism, Impressionism, and the Arts and Crafts movement. Among the major artists represented are Jean-Léon Gérôme, Gustave Courbet, Claude Monet, and Édouard Manet.

Early-twentieth-century modernist movements are represented by works by Odilon Redon, Gabriele Münter, and Russian master Ilya Repin, whose paintings are rare outside his homeland. The museum continues to expand its collection of twentieth-century art, allowing visitors and students to assess the European contribution to Modernism.

The Henry and Rose Pearlman Foundation has placed its collection of Post-Impressionist art on loan to the museum, including works by Vincent van Gogh, Paul Cézanne, Amedeo Modigliani, Henri de Toulouse-Lautrec, and Chaïm Soutine.

Media related to European art in the Princeton University Art Museum at Wikimedia Commons

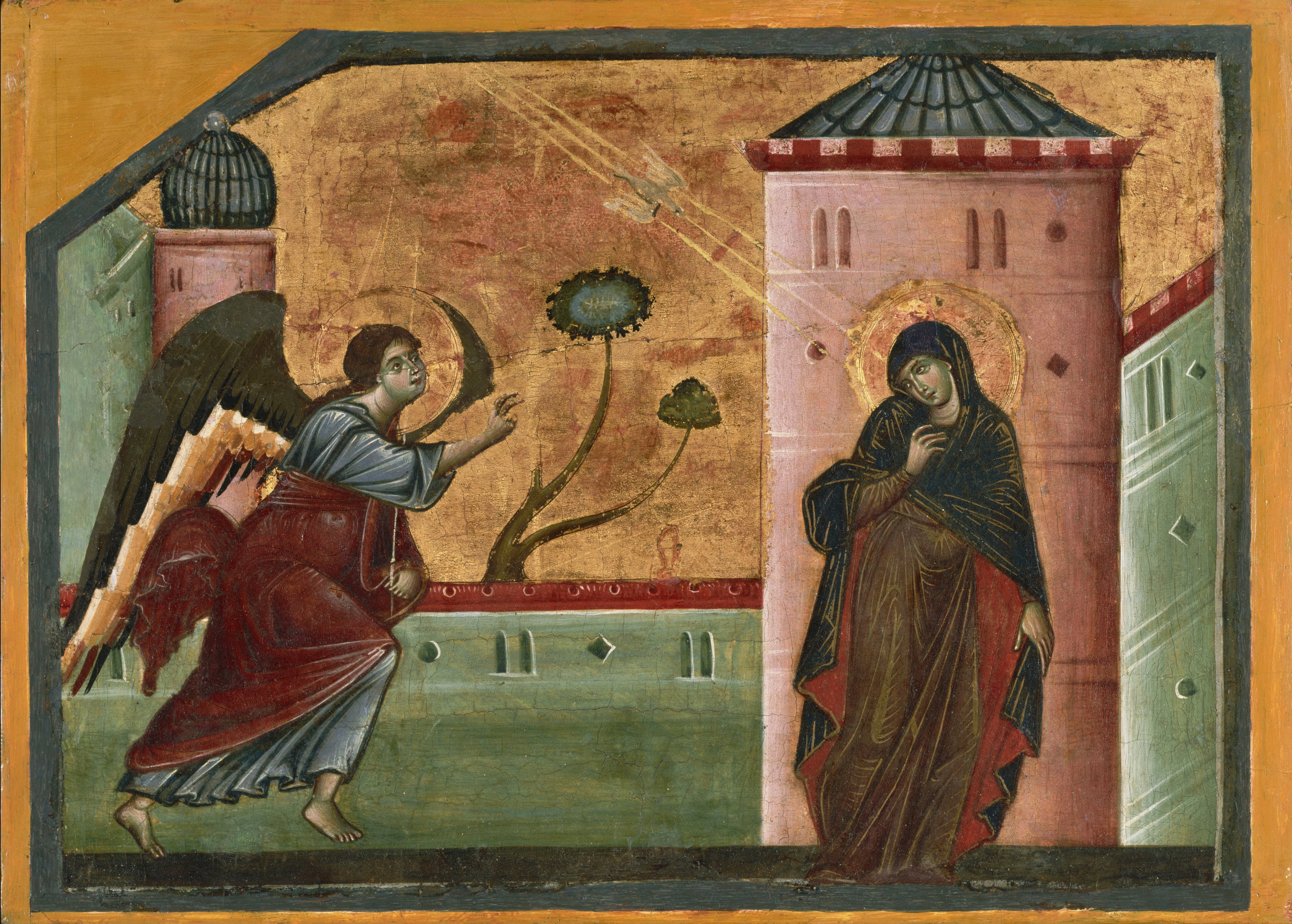
Guido da Siena, Annunciation, 1262-1279

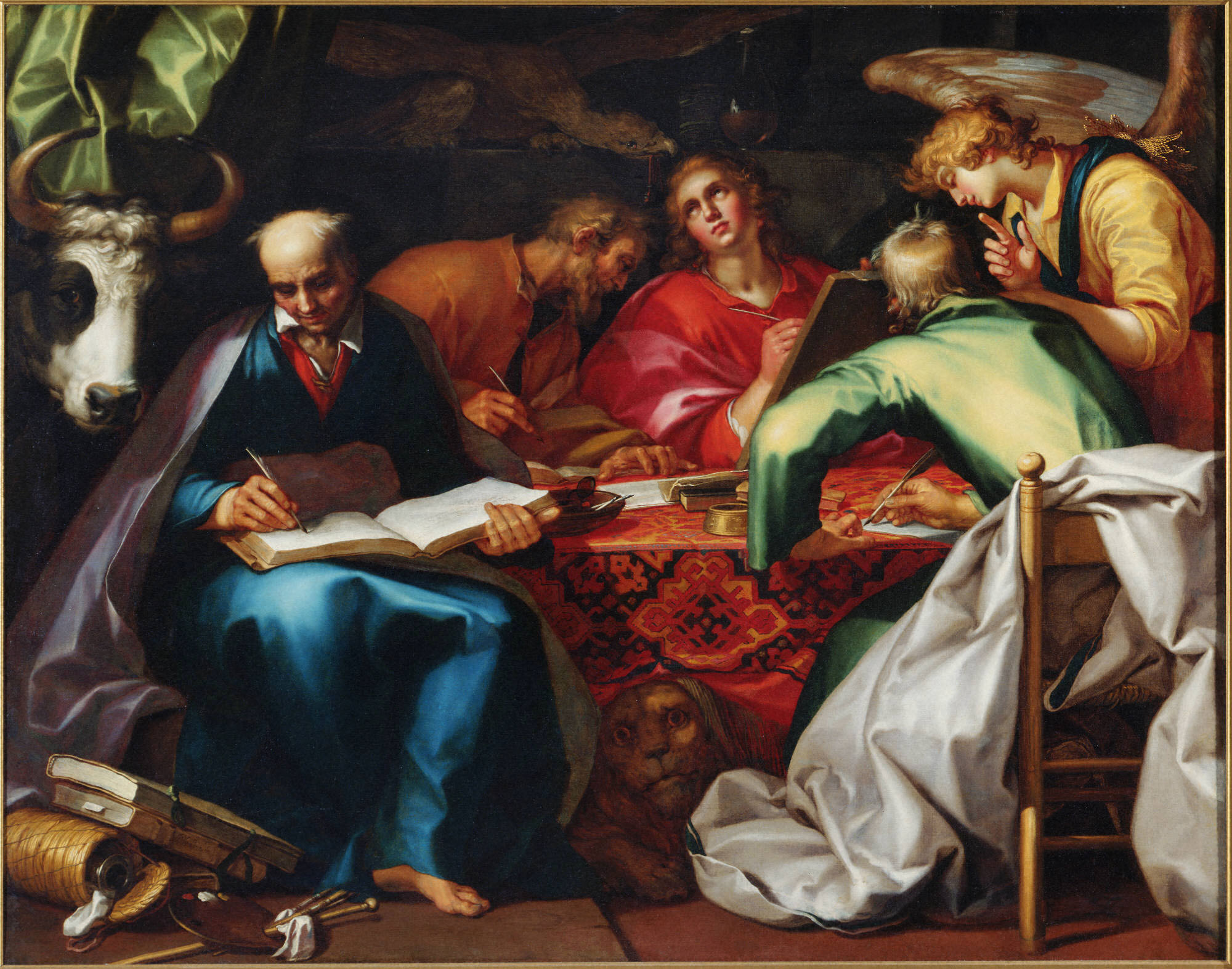
Abraham Bloemaert, The Four Evangelists, ca. 1612-1615

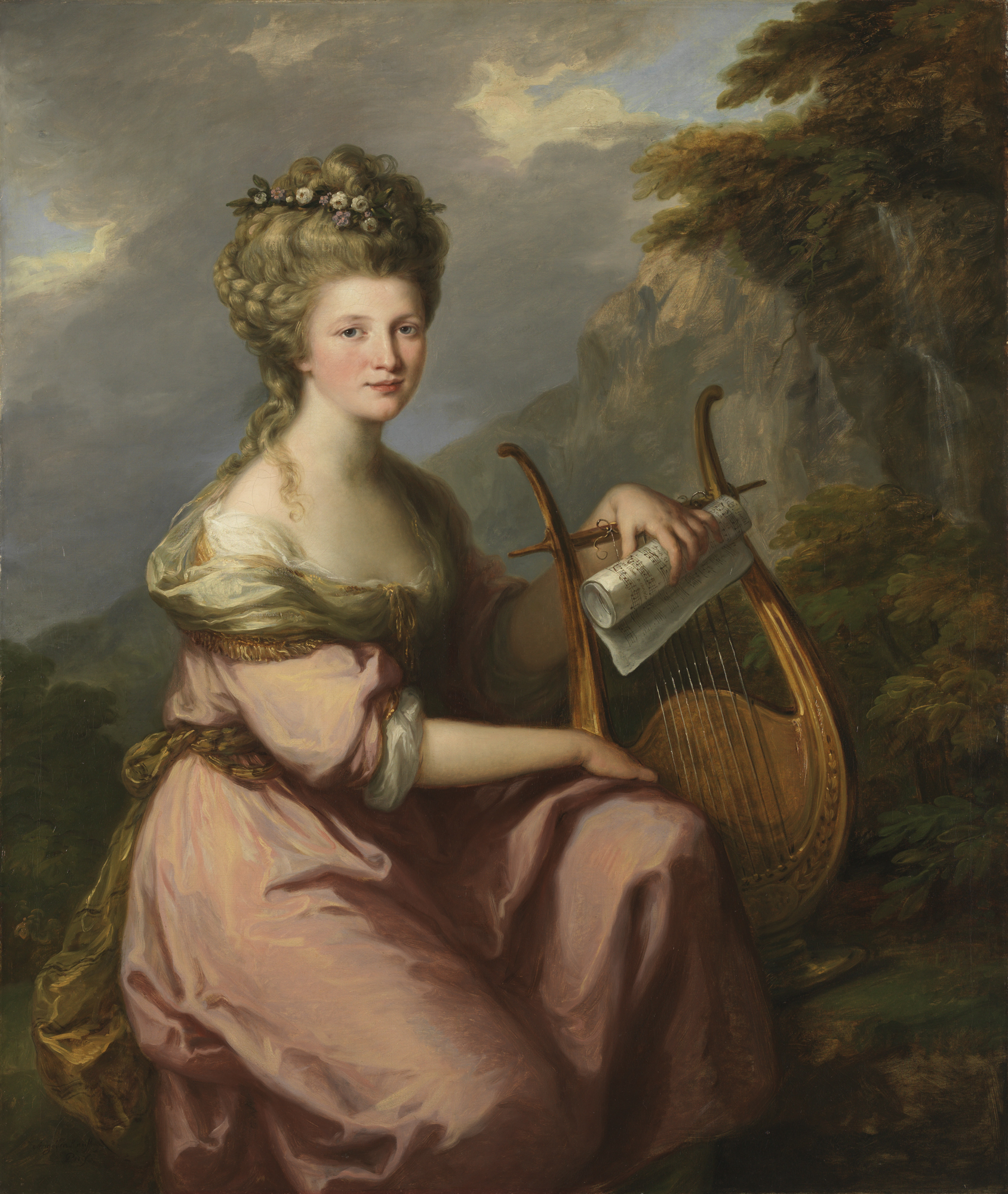
Angelica Kauffmann, Portrait of Sarah Harrop (Mrs. Bates) as a Muse, ca. 1780–81

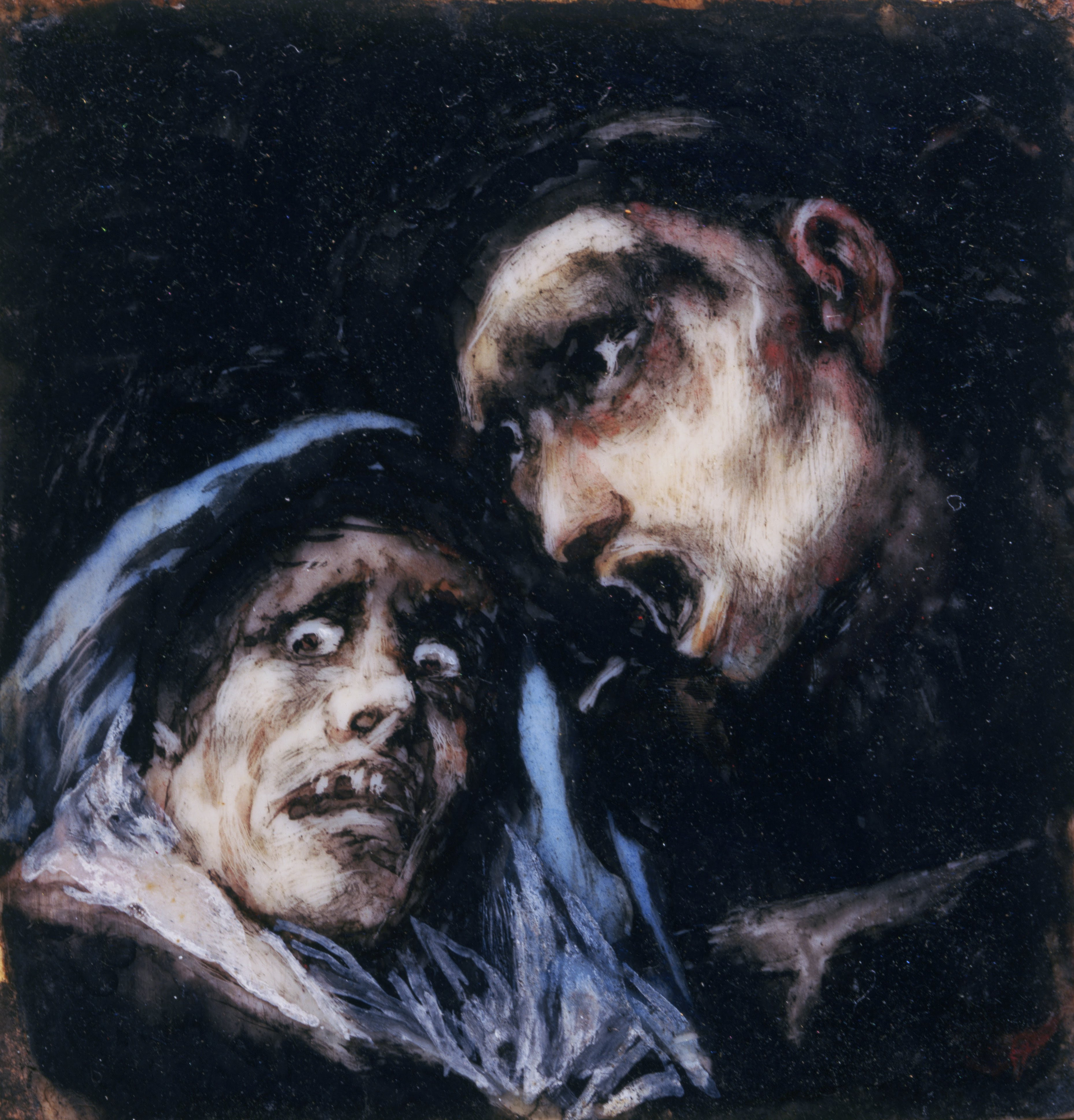
Francisco de Goya, Monk Talking to an Old Woman, 1824-25

=== Modern and contemporary art ===
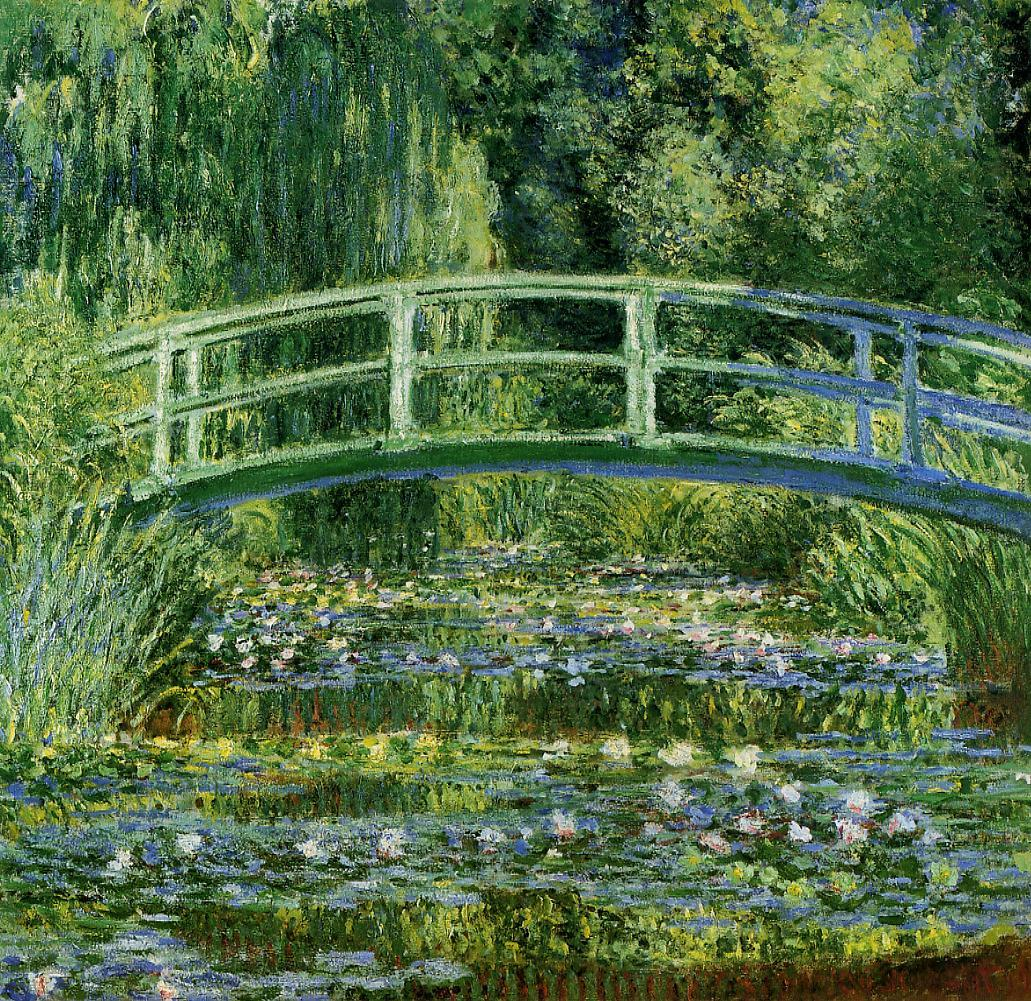
Claude Monet, Water Lilies and Japanese Bridge, 1899

The Department of Modern and Contemporary Art encompasses works created throughout the world between 1870 and the present, including painting, sculpture, video, and performance. The systematic collection of modern works began in the late 1940s, with many key pieces received as alumni gifts or bequests. The collection includes an important group of late landscapes by Claude Monet as well as an enigmatic painting by Édouard Manet, found in his studio after his death. Twentieth-century modernism is represented by a small but stellar group of works by artists including Odilon Redon, Vasily Kandinsky, Gabriele Münter, Emil Nolde, Max Ernst, Pablo Picasso, Yves Tanguy, and Jean Arp. A rare late work by Ilya Repin is among his most important works outside his native Russia.

One of the most important works in the museum's postwar collection is Willem de Kooning's Black Friday, from his breakthrough exhibition in 1948. Other artists represented in the strong collection of postwar art include Romare Bearden, Lee Bontecou, Dan Flavin, Yayoi Kusama, Sol LeWitt, Morris Louis, Ad Reinhardt, Martha Rosler, David Smith, Robert Smithson, Frank Stella, and Hannah Wilke, among others. The museum's holding in Pop art are particularly strong, including works by George Segal, Tom Wesselmann, and Andy Warhol. The museum renewed its commitment to contemporary art in 2008, with priority given to works that make significant contributions to the field and exemplify the pressing cultural, social, and philosophical issues of their day. Recent acquisitions include artwork by Doug Aitken, Jennifer Allora & Guillermo Calzadilla, Polly Apfelbaum, Sanford Biggers, Ellen Gallagher, Wade Guyton, Matthew Day Jackson, Wangechi Mutu, and Javier Téllez.

Media related to Modern art in the Princeton University Art Museum at Wikimedia Commons

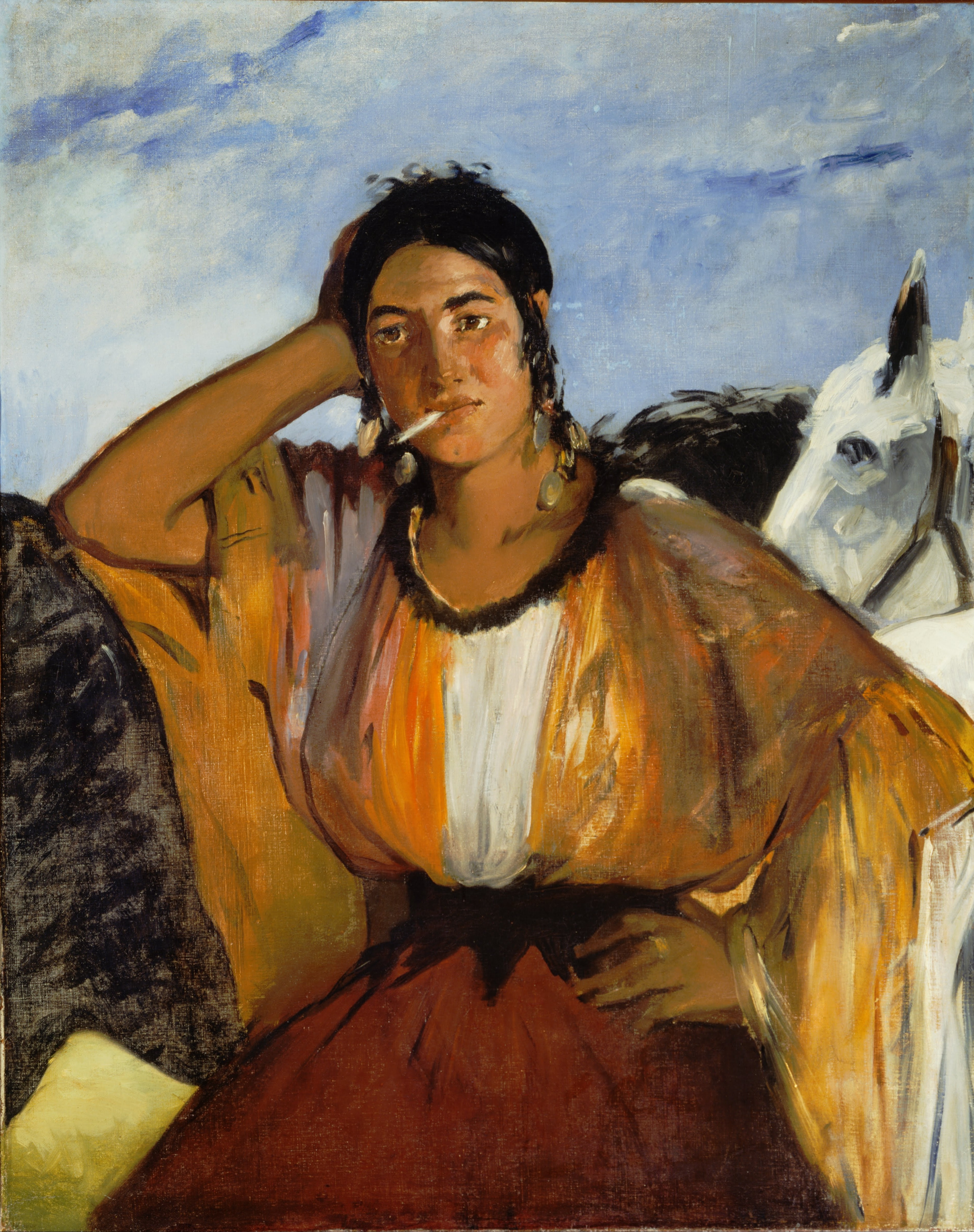
Édouard Manet, Gypsy with a Cigarette, before 1883

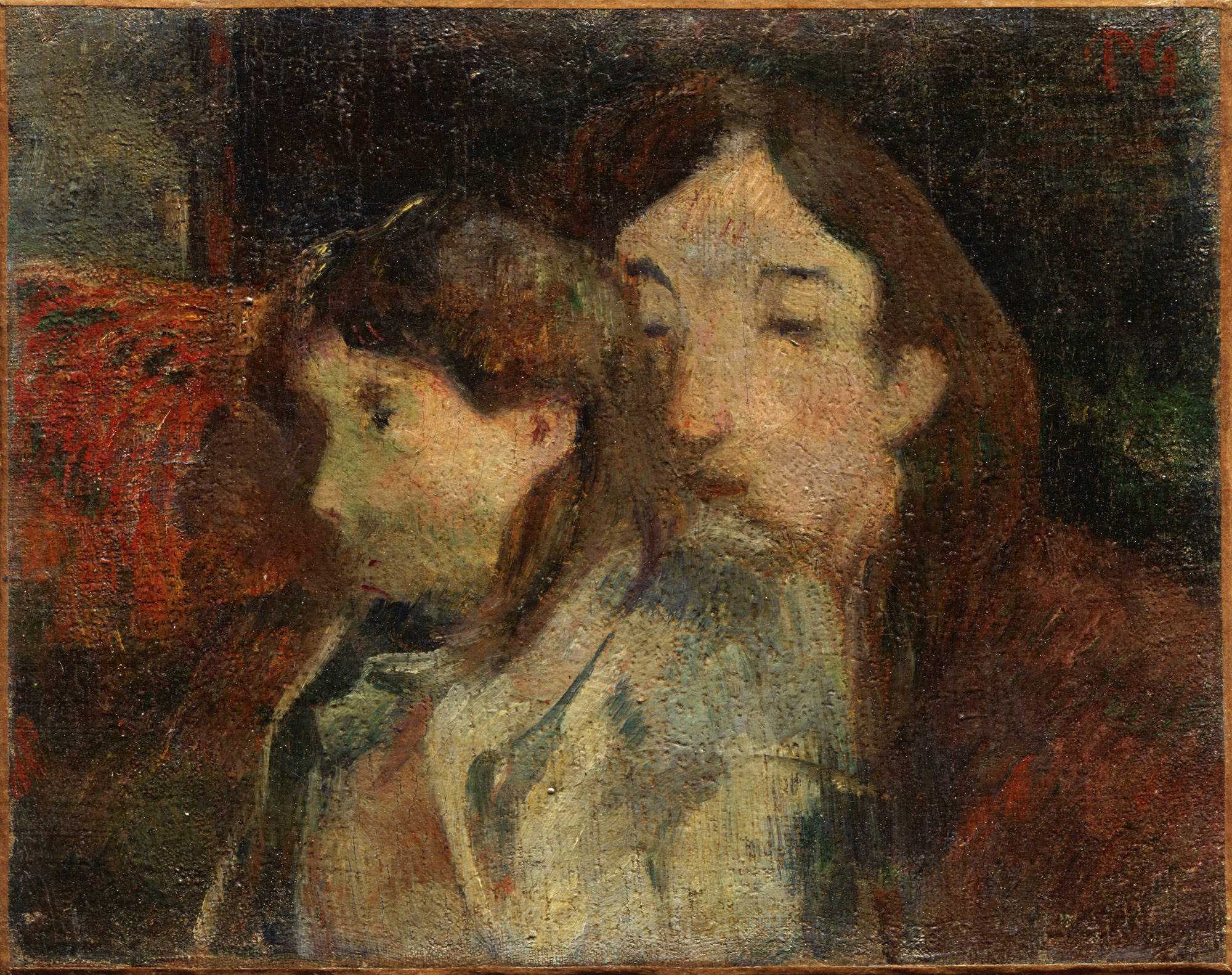
Paul Gauguin, Figures in an interior, ca. 1890

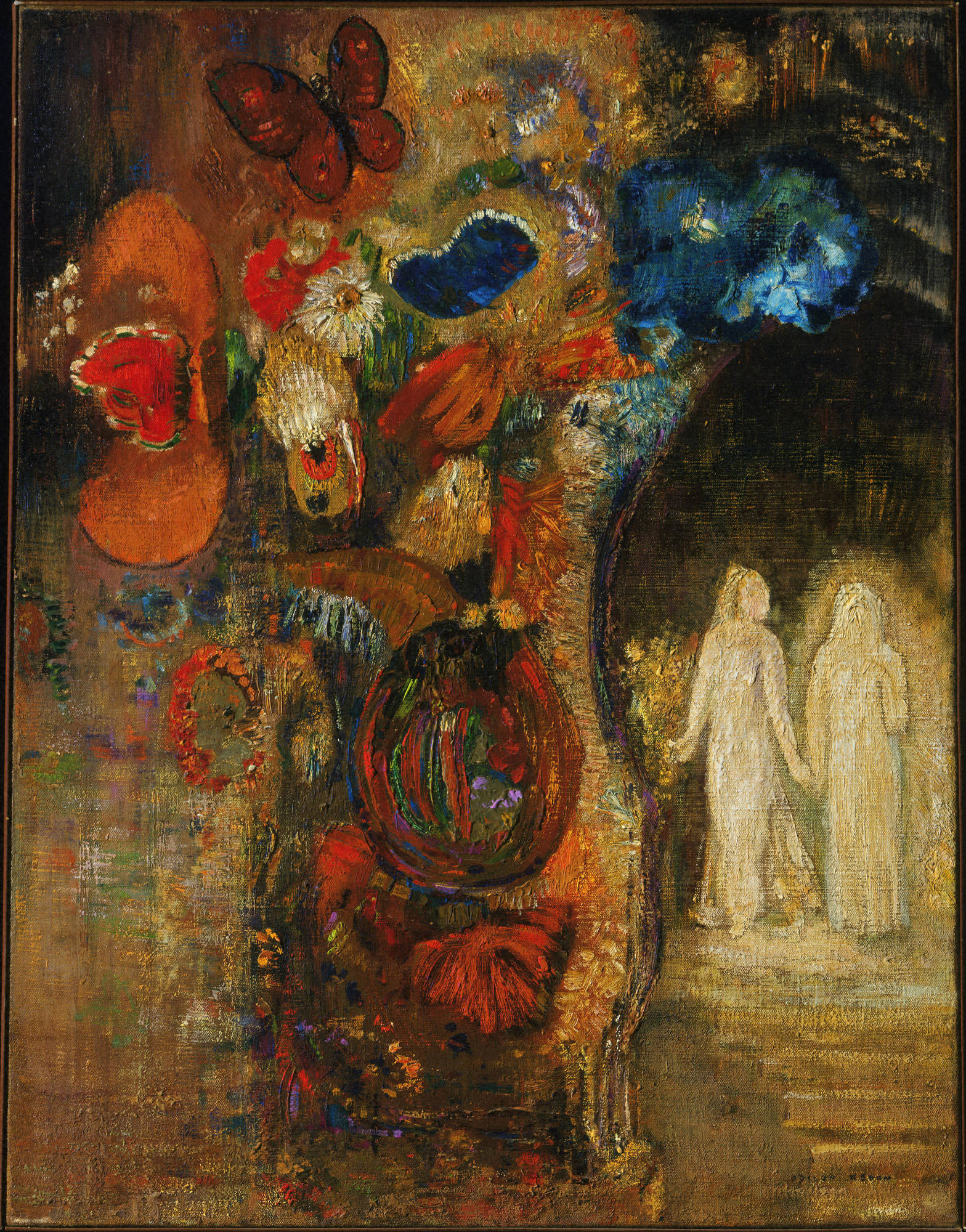
Odilon Redon, Apparition, 1905–10

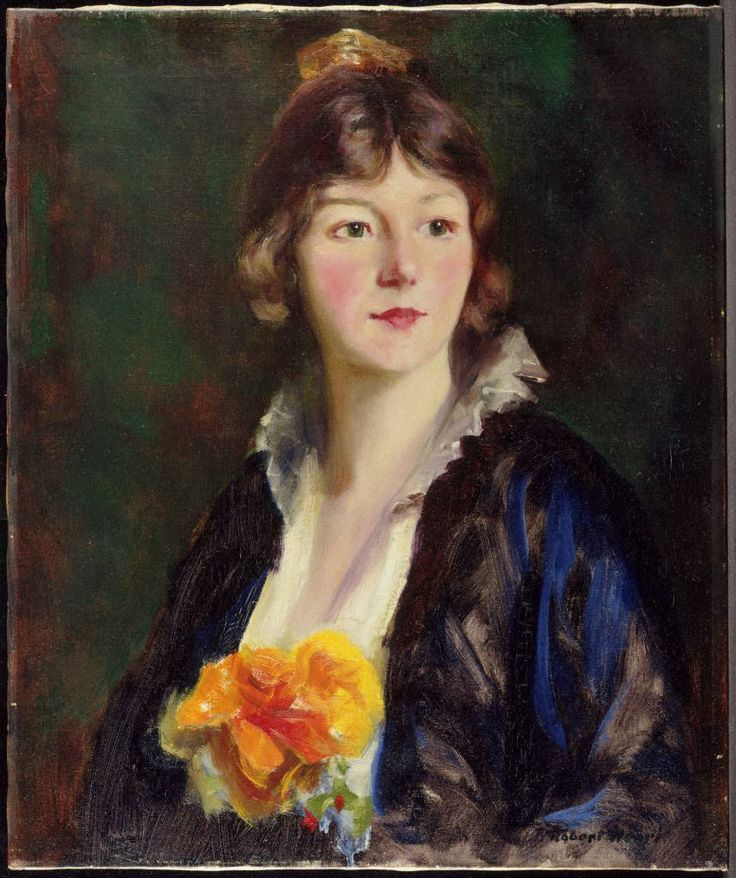
Robert Henri, Mildred Clarke von Kienbusch, 1914

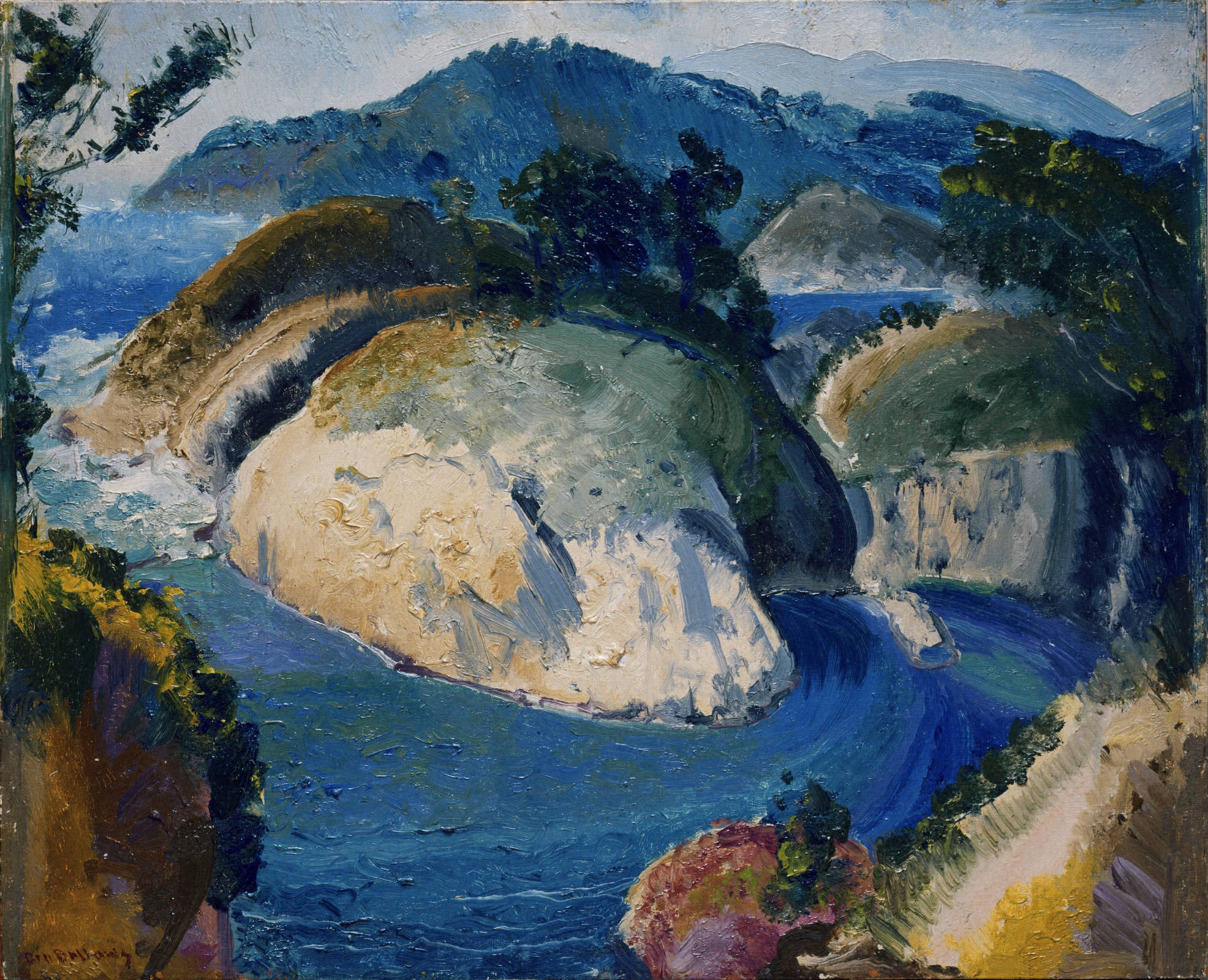
George Bellows, California Headlands, 1917

=== Photography ===
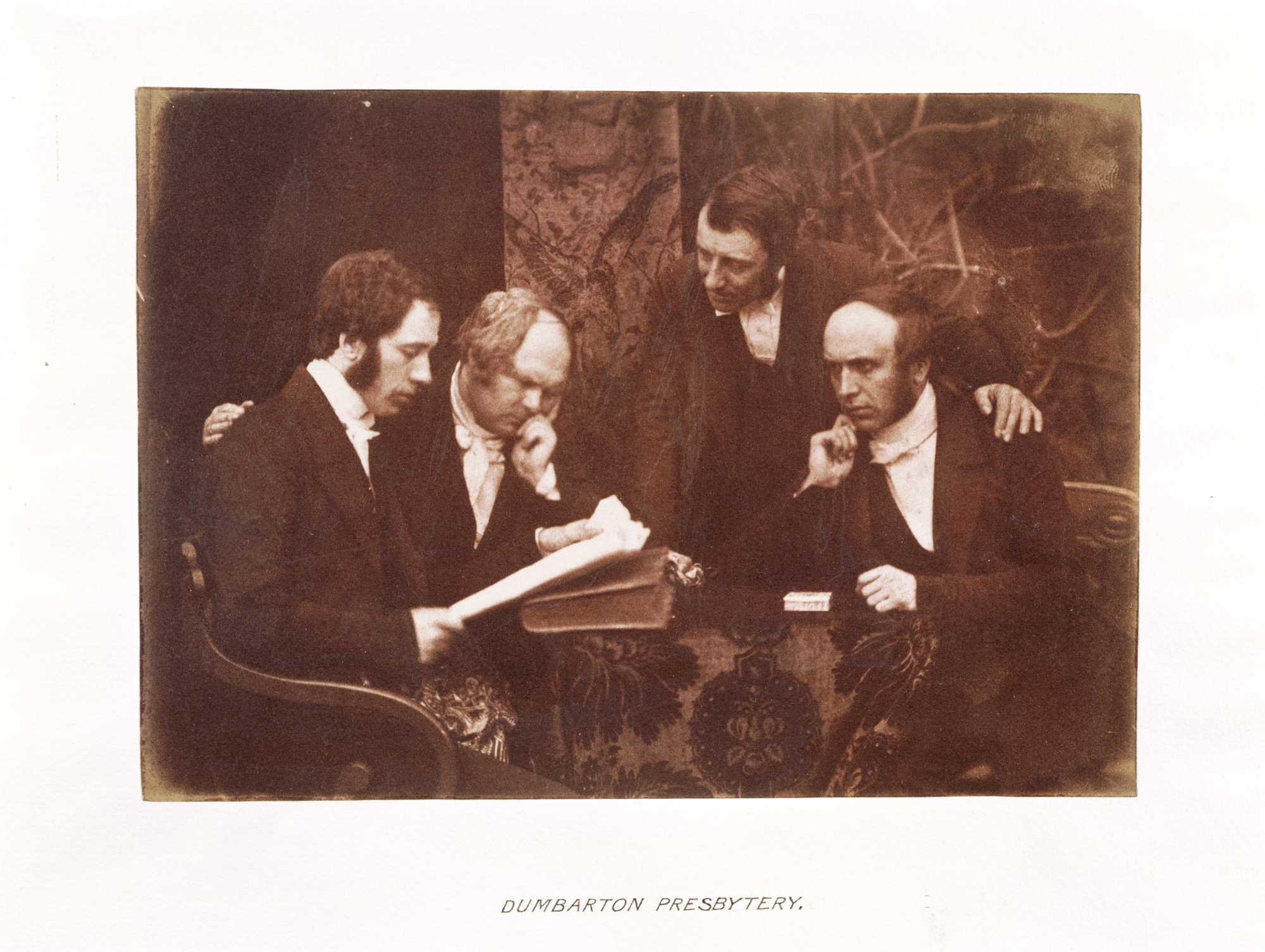
David Octavius Hill and Robert Adamson, Dumbarton Presbytery, 1845

Princeton's photography collection is one of the leading museum collections in the United States. The start of the collection was the 1949 gift by retired director Frank Jewett Mather Jr. of Alfred Stieglitz's landmark image The Steerage. The decisive moment for the medium at Princeton came in 1971 when David Hunter McAlpin, Class of 1920, made a donation of his collection of 457 prints. McAlpin was a friend and patron to two generations of American photographers, donating significant representations of the work of Stieglitz, Paul Strand, Charles Sheeler, Ansel Adams, Wynn Bullock, Imogen Cunningham, Edward Weston, and Eliot Porter, among others. McAlpin also established a fund which has enabled, over time, the purchase of some 400 photographs, including work by Hill & Adamson, László Moholy-Nagy and William Henry Fox Talbot.

In 1972, Peter C. Bunnell, later museum director, was hired as the David H. McAlpin Professor of the History of Photography and Modern Art, making Princeton the first American university, and one of only a few worldwide, where photography was taught within the art history curriculum. In his nearly thirty years at Princeton, he went on to build one of the foremost graduate programs in the field and to build one of the most notable teaching collections of historical photographs. The construction of the McAlpin Study Center during the expansion of the museum in 1989 created a space for seminars to be taught using original works from the collection.

The collection includes work covering all major movements and historical trends. Particular strengths include nineteenth-century British photography, French photographs of the 1850s-1870s, and Japanese and American postwar photography. The museum has major holdings in Pictorialism, anchored by the Clarence H. White collection and the archives of his eponymous school of photography. In 1976, Minor White bequeathed to the museum his negatives, library, correspondence, and close to 20,000 prints of his own and other artists. Other archives held by the museum include those of Ruth Bernhard and William B. Dyer.

Media related to Photographs in the Princeton University Art Museum at Wikimedia Commons

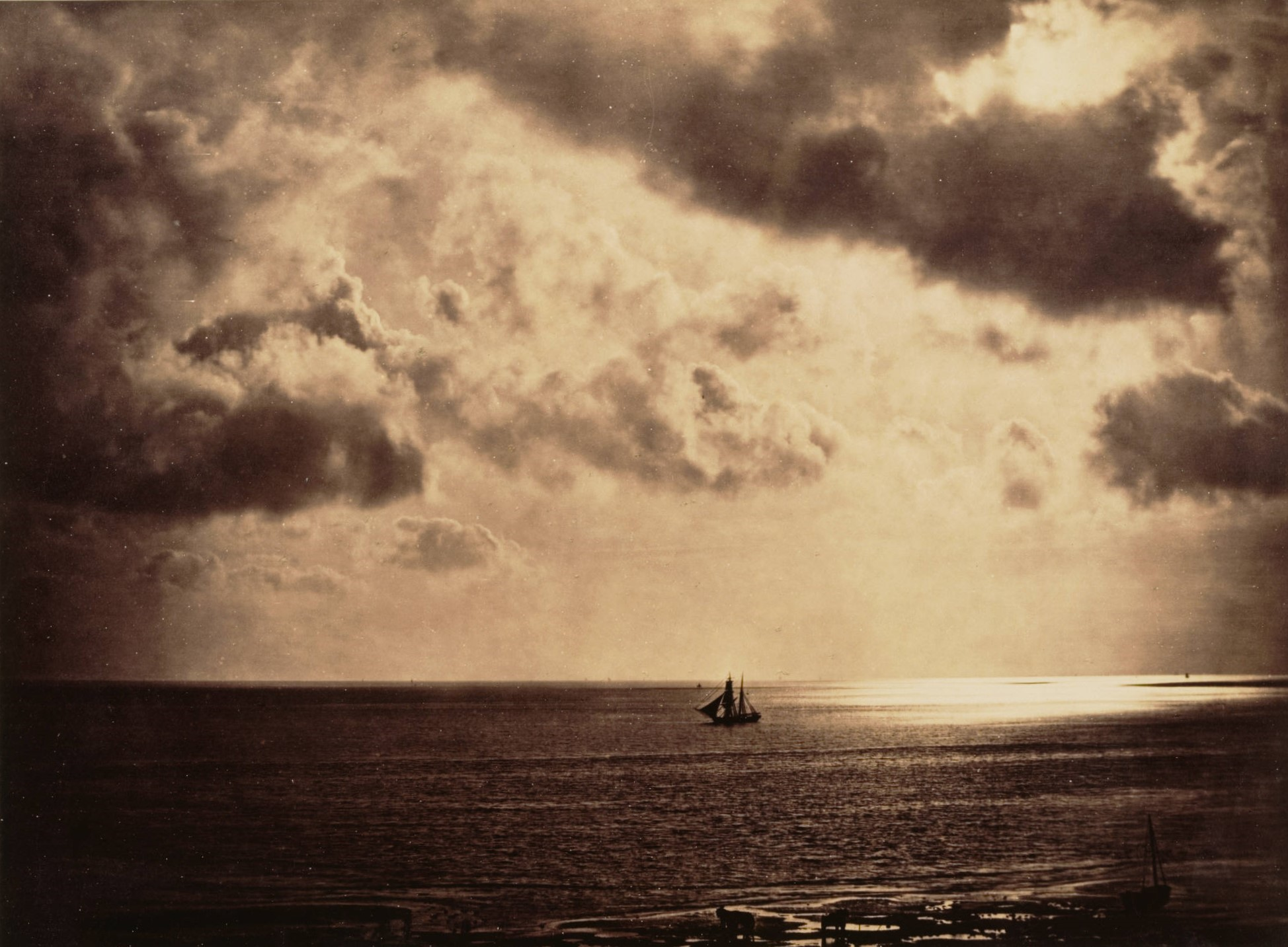
Gustave Le Gray, Brig on the Water, 1856

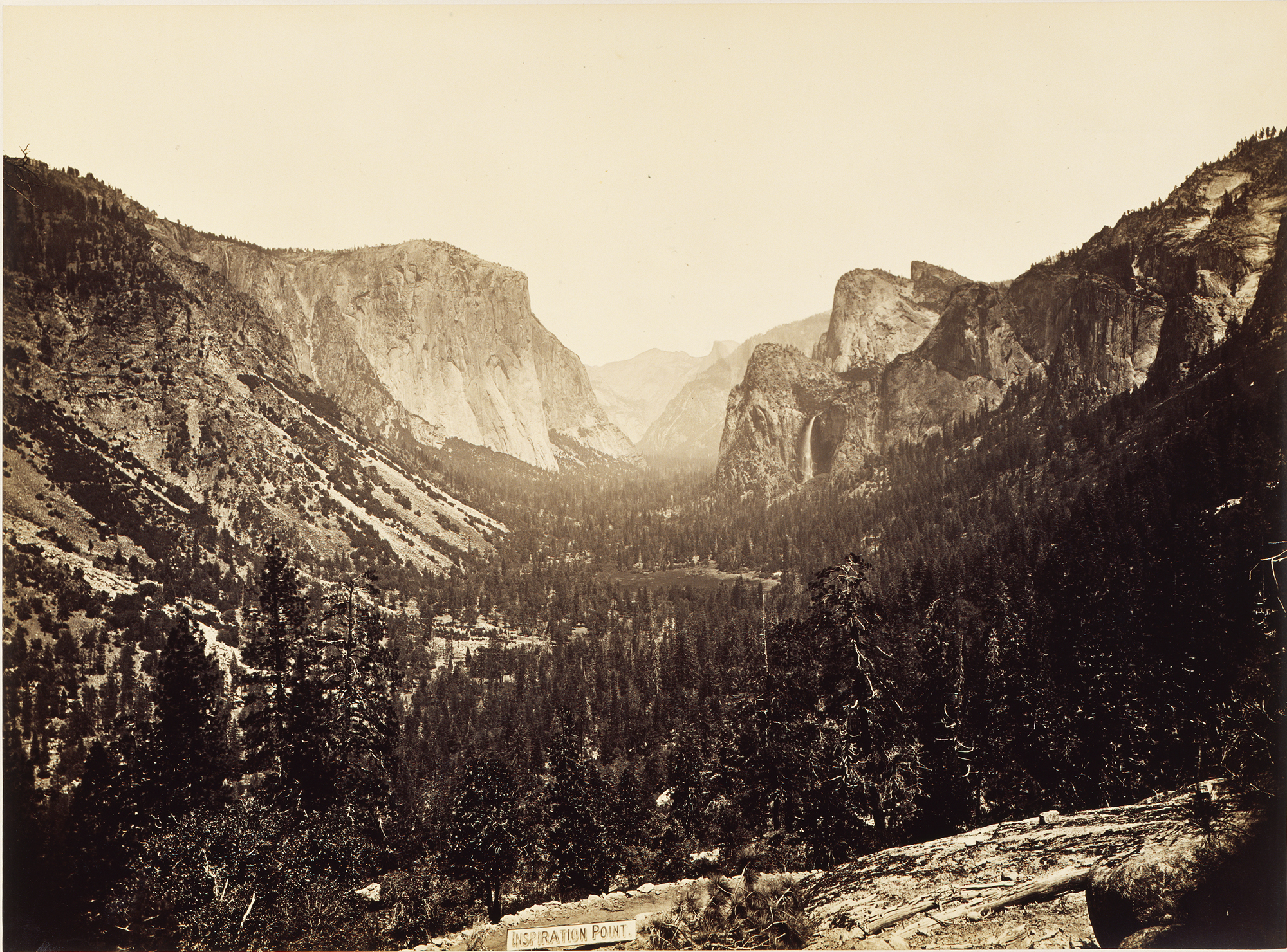
Carleton Watkins, View from Inspiration Point, 1879

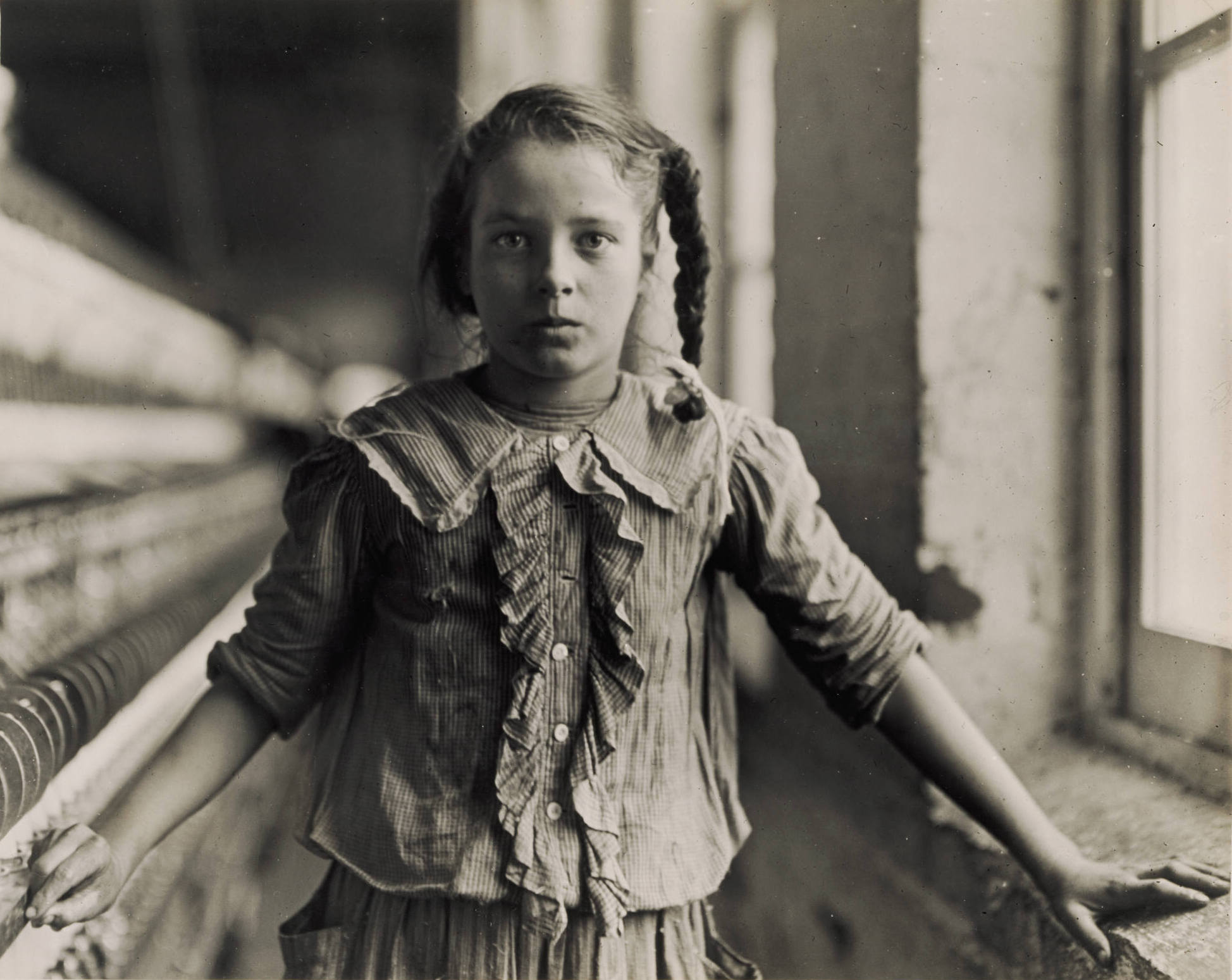
Lewis W. Hine, Adolescent Girl, a Spinner, in a Carolina Cotton Mill, 1908

=== Prints and drawings ===
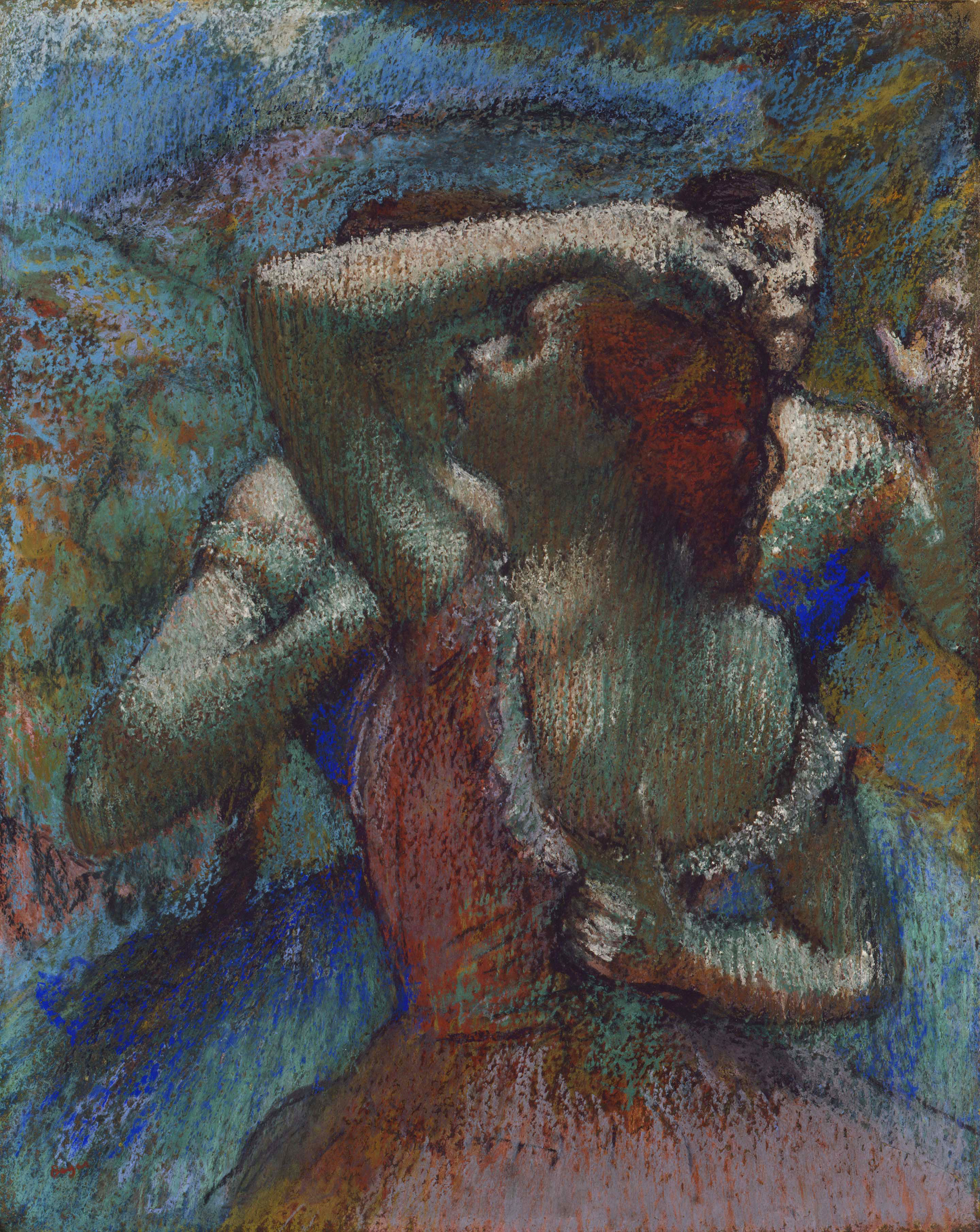
Edgar Degas, Dancers, 1900, pastel with charcoal on tracing paper mounted on cream wove paper

The collection of Prints and Drawings includes 15,000 works on paper as well as a small number of Illuminated manuscripts, by artists from the fourteenth century to the present. Notable areas of strength include old master and nineteenth-century European prints, Italian and Spanish Renaissance and Baroque drawings, eighteenth- and nineteenth-century American and British drawings, watercolors, and sketchbooks, a selection of Indian and Persian miniature painting, and a large collection of modern and contemporary Latin American works on paper.

The print collection began with the large bequest of Junius Spencer Morgan, Class of 1888, in 1932, which included old master engravings and etchings, primarily by the notable seventeenth-century printmakers Hendrik Goltzius, Jacques Callot, and Stefano della Bella. In 1938, another bequest, by Dan Fellows Platt, Class of 1895, laid the foundation of the collection of drawings, with works from the sixteenth to early twentieth centuries, including notable groups by Guercino, Salvator Rosa, Giovanni Battista and Domenico Tiepolo, and George Romney. Frank Jewett Mather Jr., the museum's second director, made numerous purchases in the 1940s, including Italian Renaissance drawings, works on paper by Samuel Palmer, and watercolors by John Marin, and Paul Cézanne. In 1945, Professor Clifton R. Hall bequeathed his collection of old master prints and American watercolors, including three masterpieces by Edward Hopper. Hall also established an endowment for the Department of Art and Archaeology specifically for the purchase of works on paper, which has enabled the purchase of an exceptional collection of sixteenth- through eighteenth-century Spanish drawings.

Professor Felton Gibbons, following Hall's example, endowed a fund for acquiring works on paper that has allowed gaps in the collection to be filled, including Northern and Central European drawings, and to add to other areas of significance, such as German Expressionism. The modern and contemporary holdings continue to grow, with an emphasis on artists such as Glenn Ligon, Martin Puryear, Robert Rauschenberg, and Kiki Smith, who are a vital part of the teaching curriculum of the university.

Media related to Prints in the Princeton University Art Museum at Wikimedia Commons
Media related to Drawings in the Princeton University Art Museum at Wikimedia Commons

Prints

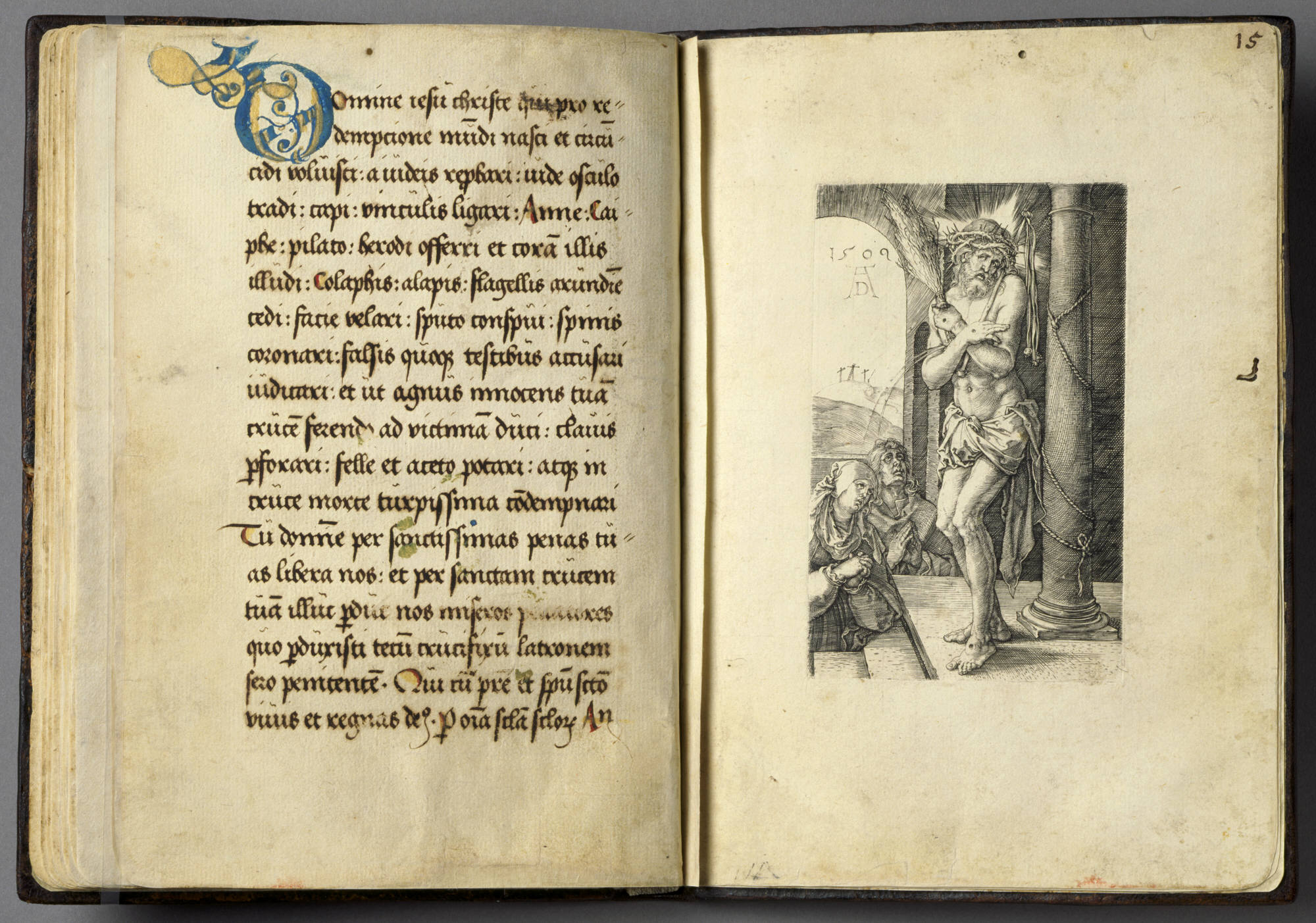
Albrecht Dürer, The Engraved Passion, 1507–1512, engraving

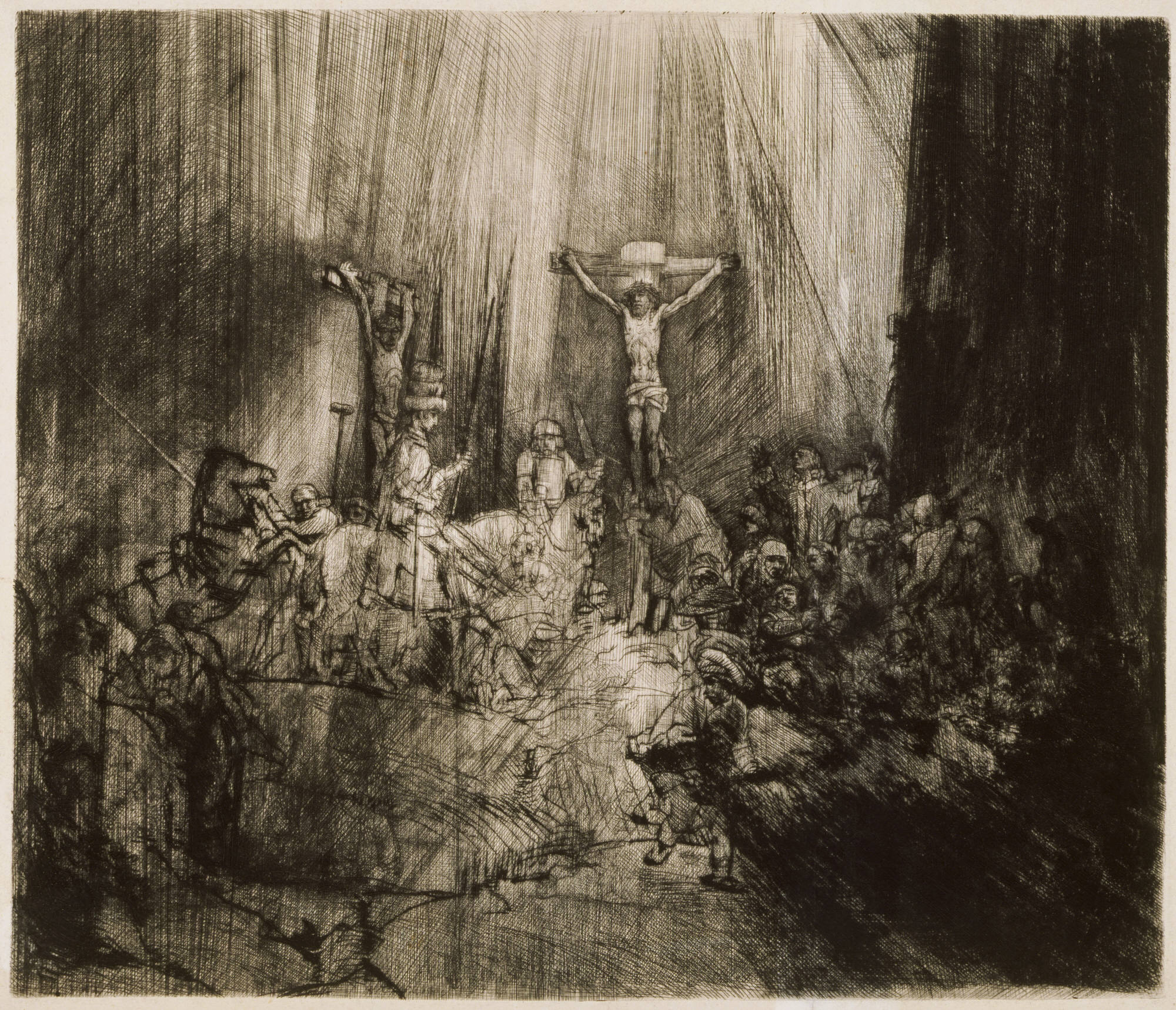
Rembrandt van Rijn, Christ Crucified between the Two Thieves (The Three Crosses), 1653–1655, drypoint and burin, fourth of five states plate

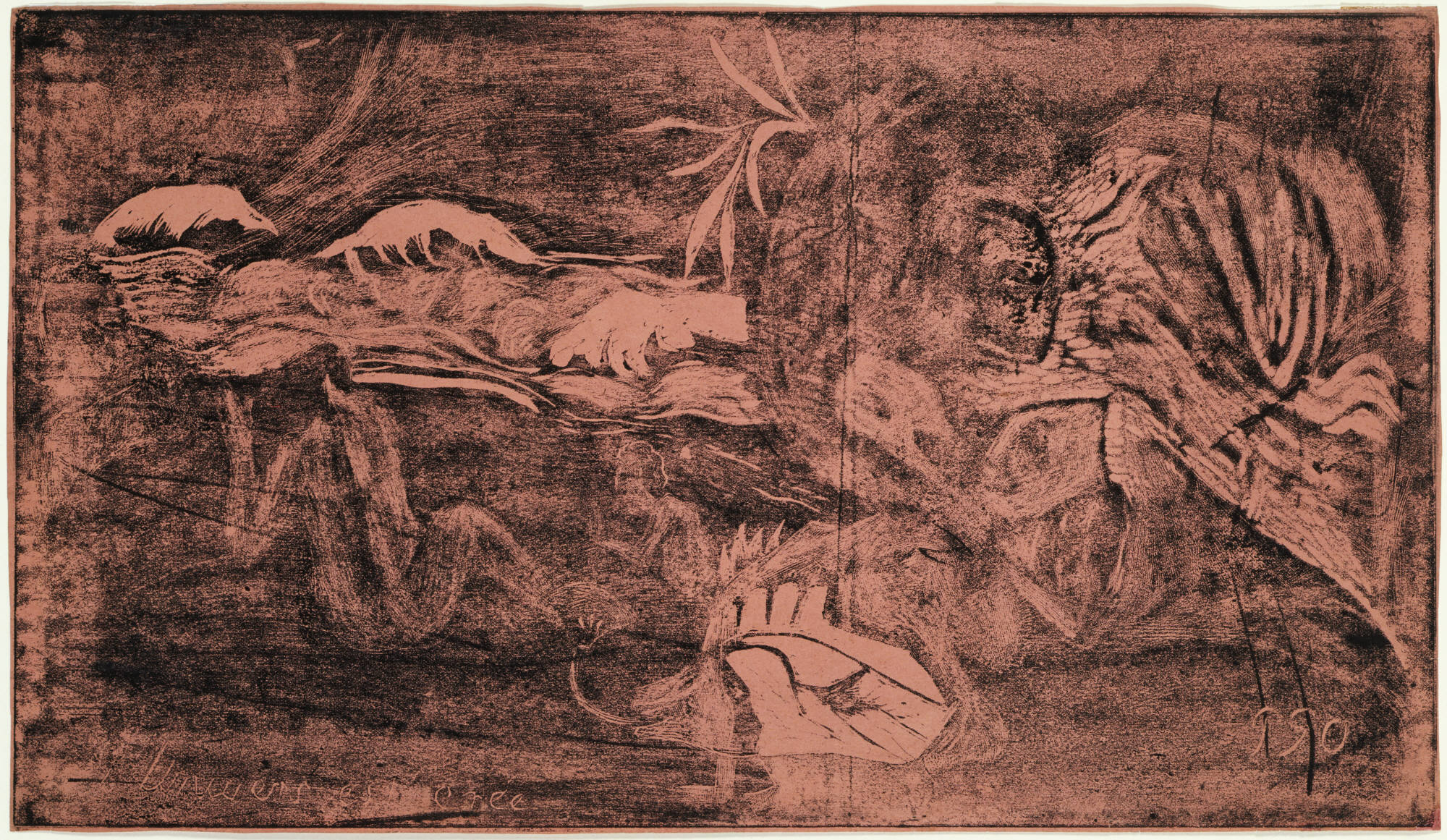
Paul Gauguin, The Universe is Created, from the Noa Noa suite, 1893–4, woodcut printed in black on thin rose-colored wove paper sheet trimmed to block

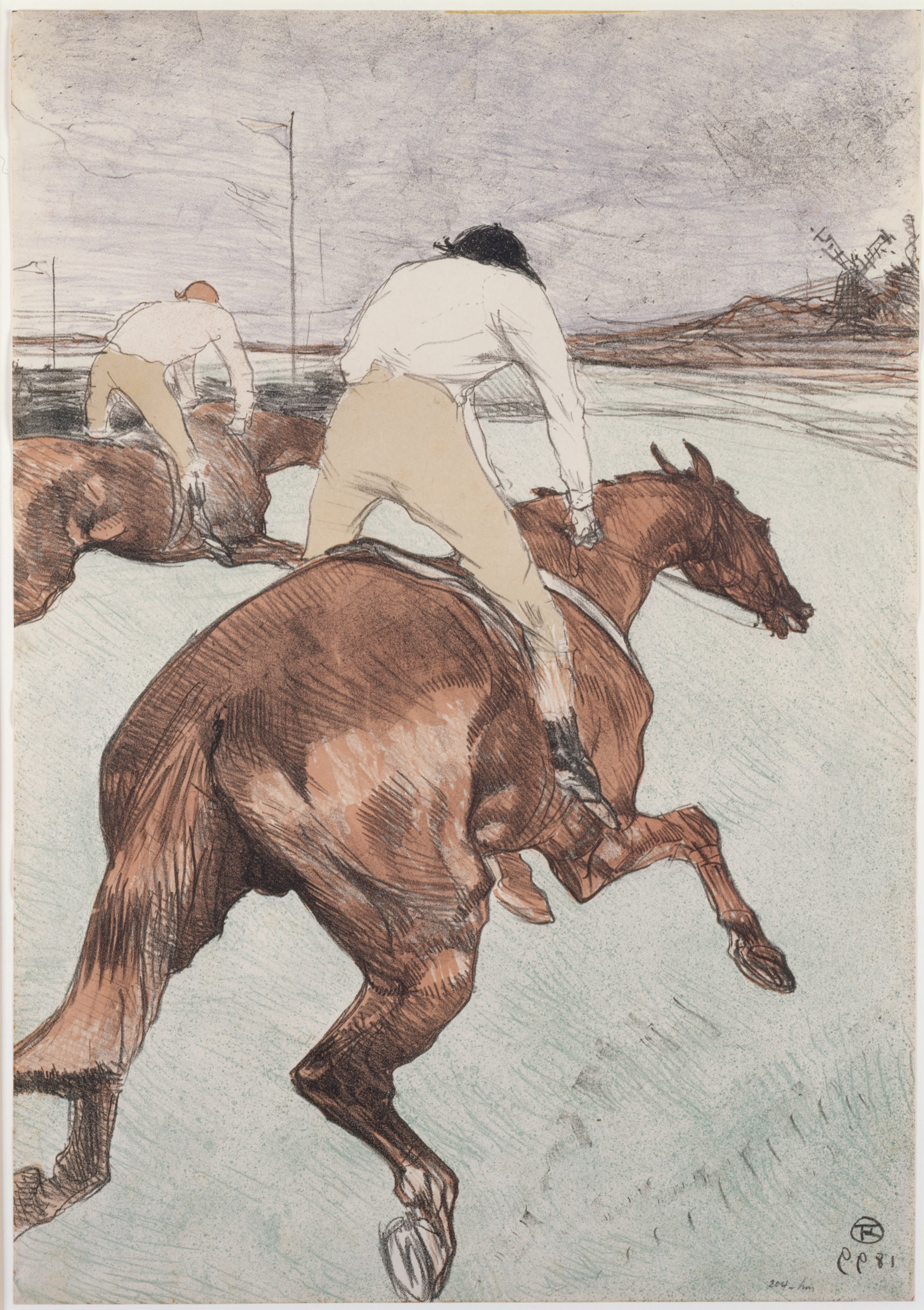
Henri de Toulouse-Lautrec, The Jockey, 1899, color lithograph
Drawings

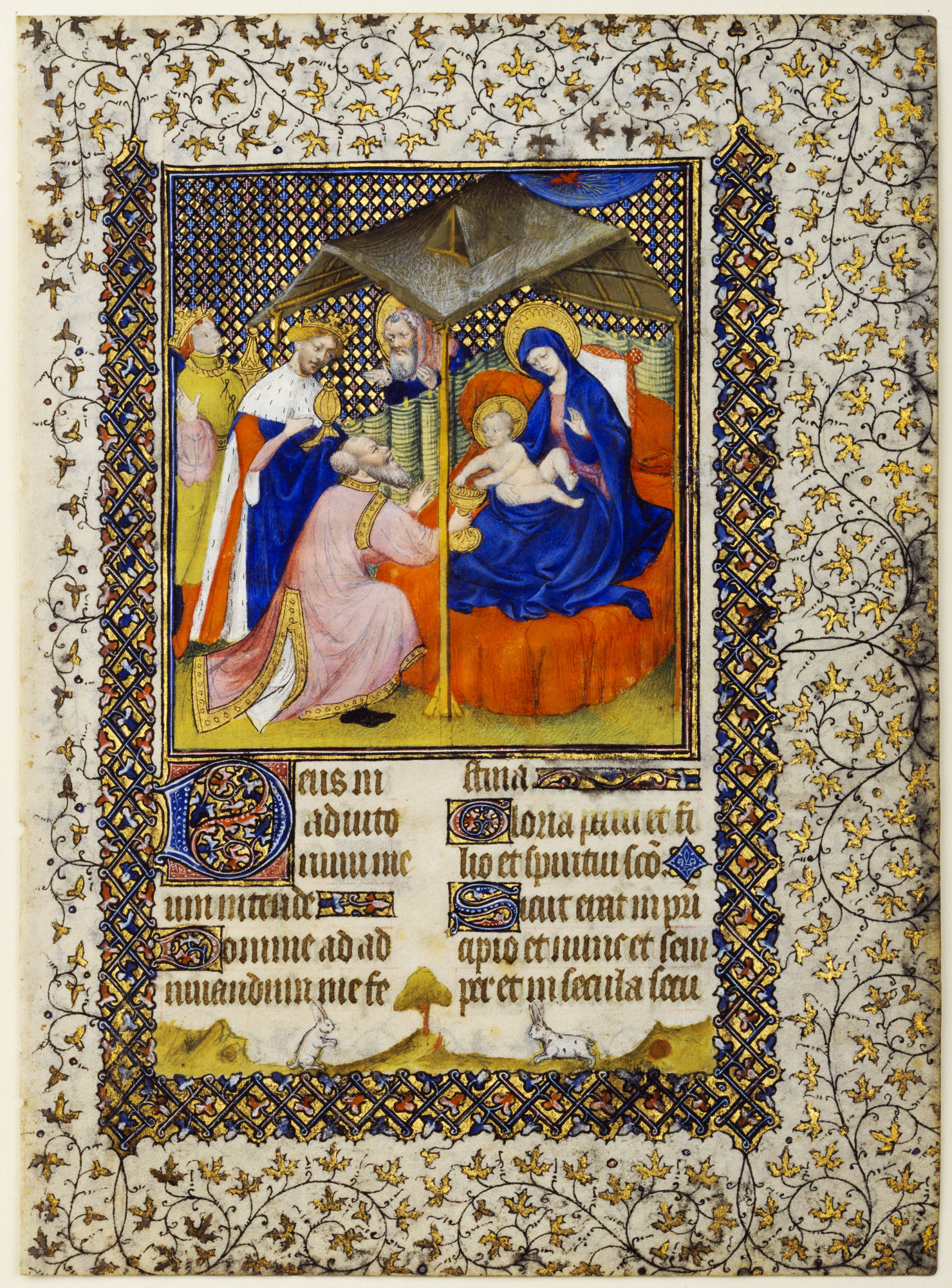
Luçon Master, Adoration of the Magi, ca. 1405, tempera and gold leaf on parchment

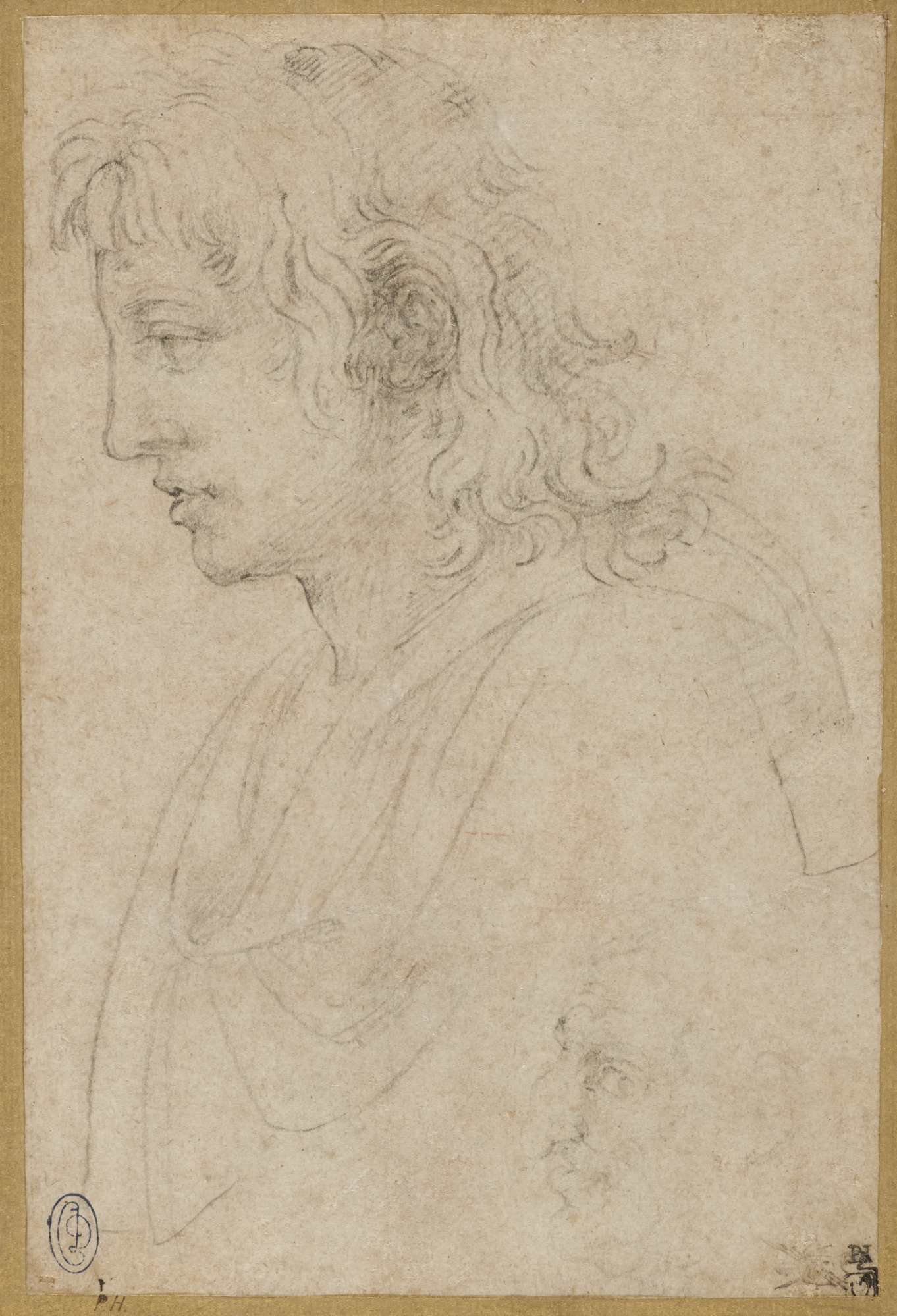
Michelangelo Buonarroti, Bust of a Youth and Caricature Head of an Old Man, Both in Left Profile, ca. 1530, black chalk on tan laid paper

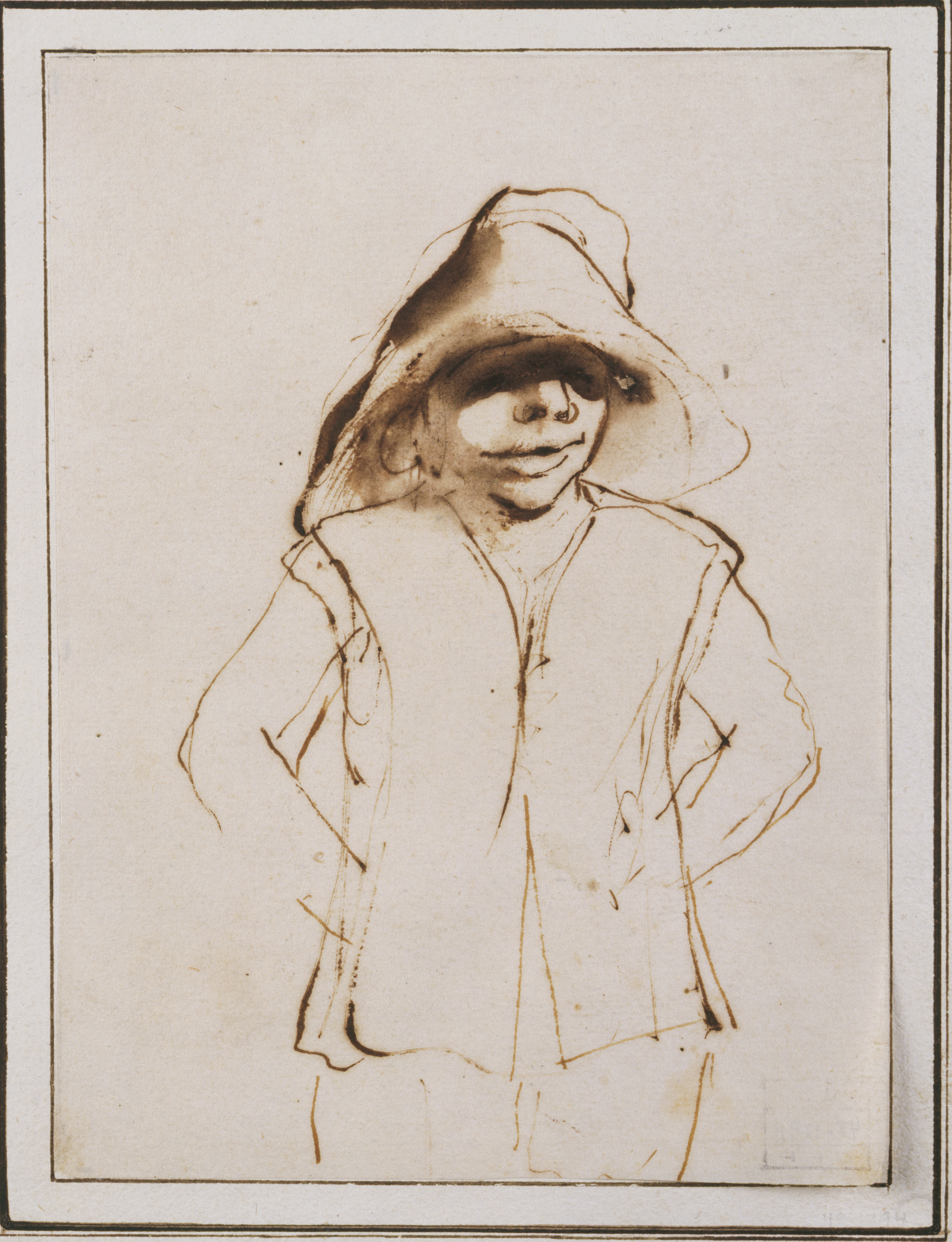
Guercino, Boy in a Large Hat, 1630s-40s, pen and brown ink with brush and brown wash on beige laid paper

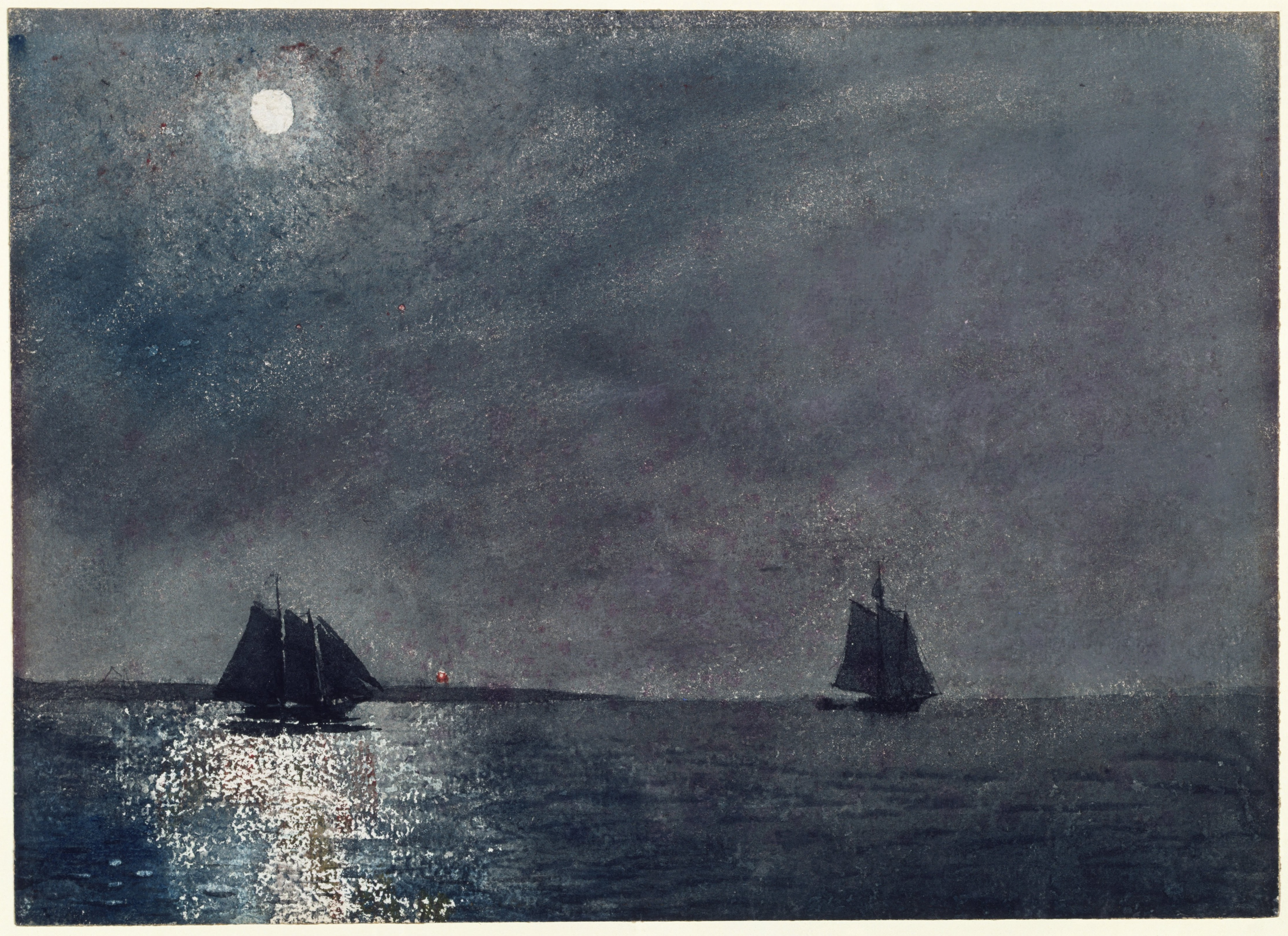
Winslow Homer, Eastern Point Light, 1880, watercolor over graphite on wove paper (cream-colored wove paper)

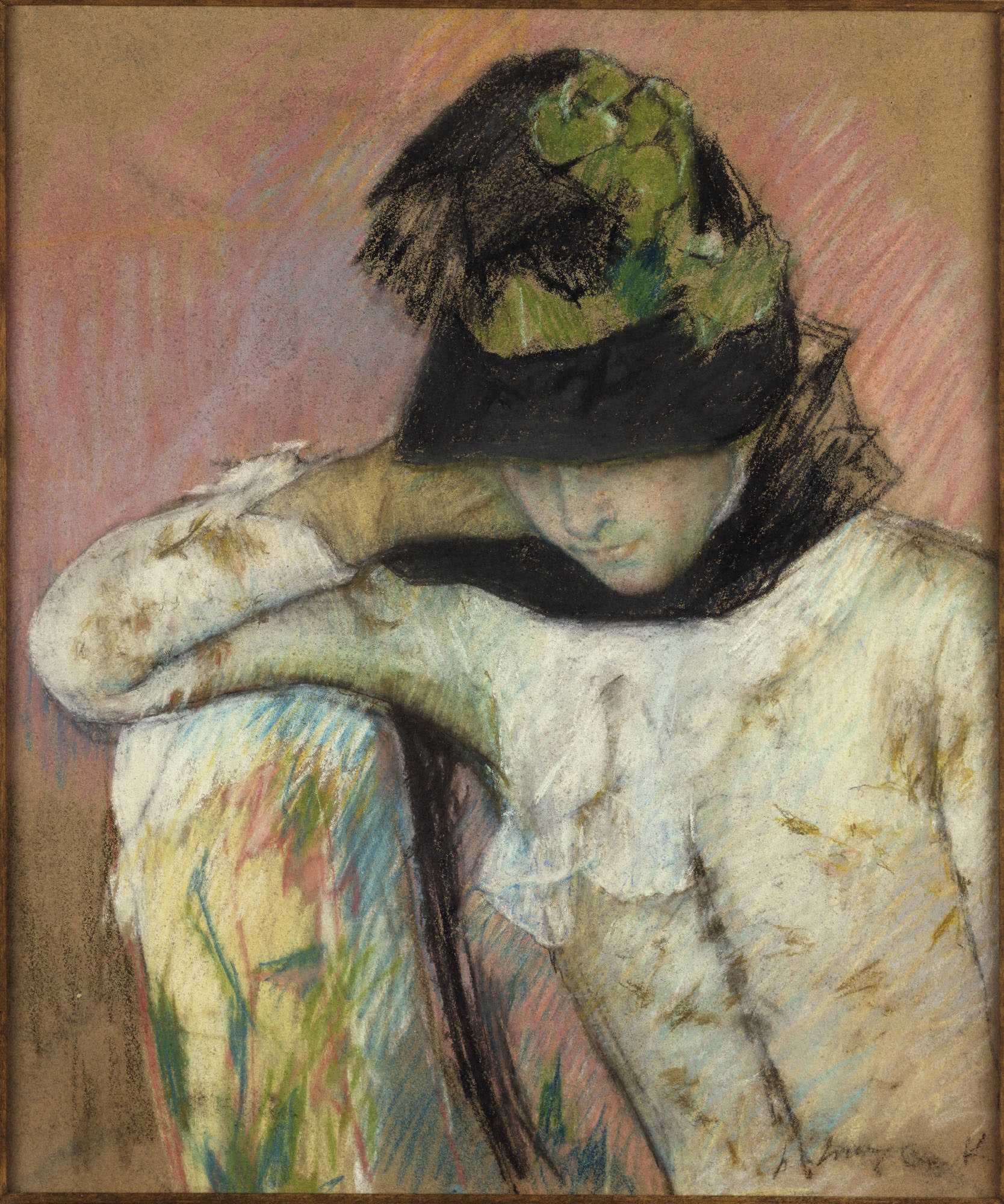
Mary Cassatt, Young Woman in a Black and Green Bonnet, 1890, pastel on tan wove paper

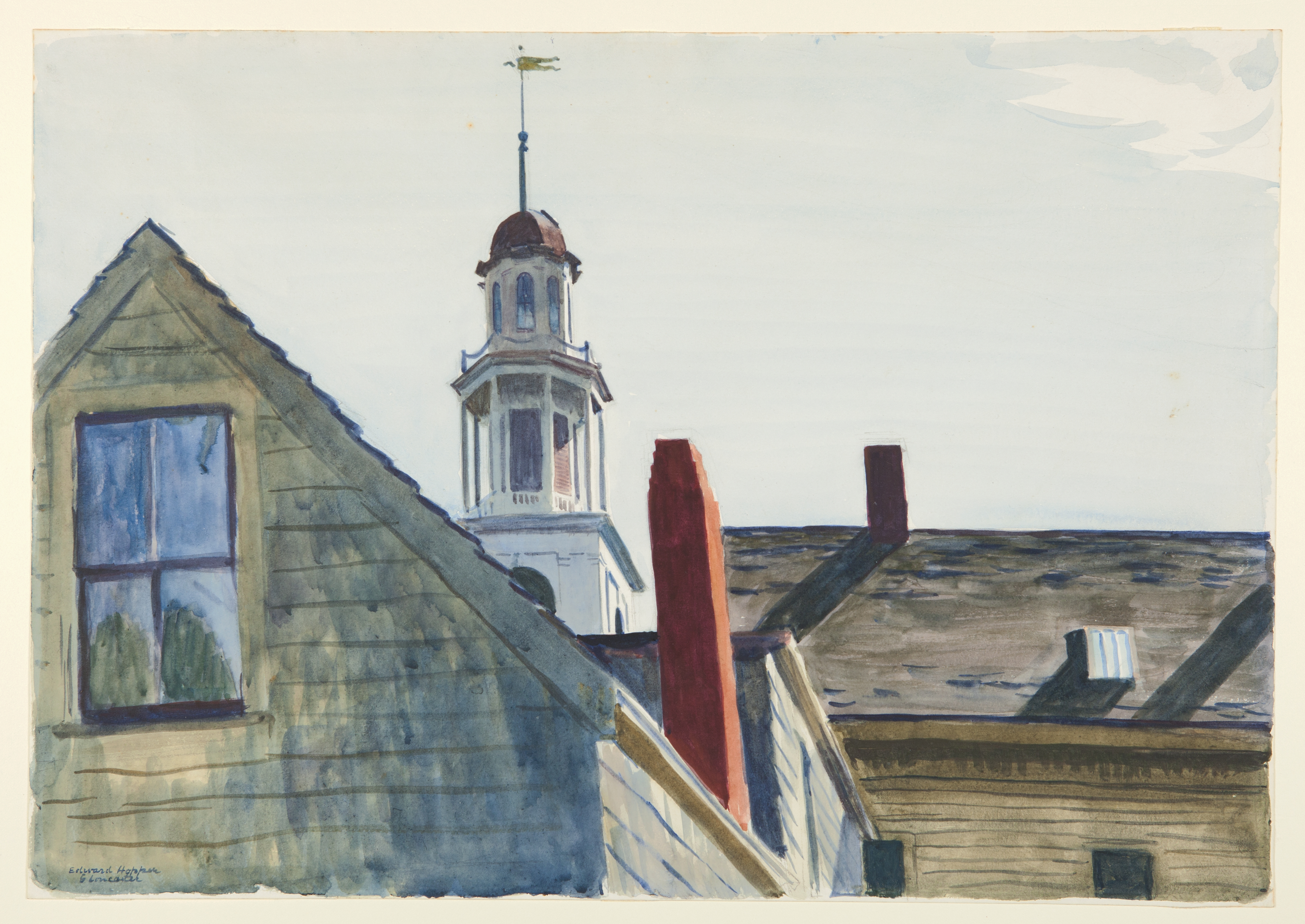
Edward Hopper, Universalist Church, 1926

== Private Collections on long-term loan ==
=== Henry and Rose Pearlman Collection ===
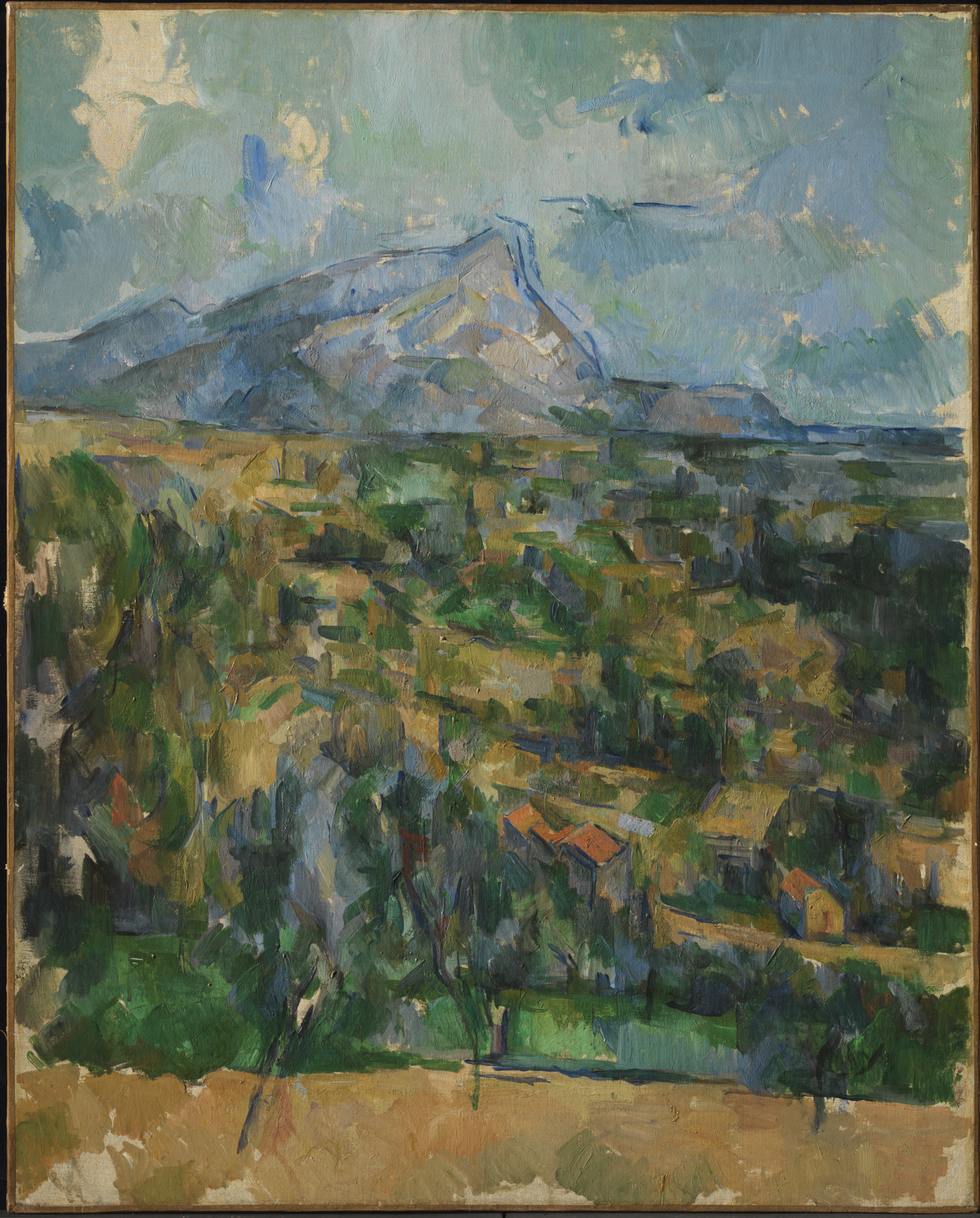
Paul Cézanne, Mont Sainte-Victoire, c. 1904-06

Henry Pearlman started his collection with the 1945 purchase, for $825, of Chaïm Soutine's View of Céret, seen in the window of the Parke-Bernet auction house while walking down Park Avenue. Pearlman had made his fortune through founding the Eastern Cold Storage Insulation Corporation in 1919 and knew little of Soutine or contemporary art at the time he started collecting. He would go on to amass more than fifty masterworks of late 19th- to mid-20th-century avant-garde European art, one of the most distinguished private collections of modern art in the United States. Among the most notable works are Paul Cézanne's Mont Sainte-Victoire, Vincent van Gogh's Tarascon Stagecoach, and Amedeo Modigliani's portrait of Jean Cocteau.

The heart of the collection is the finest and best preserved collection of watercolors by Cézanne in the world, sixteen works including Three Pears, which was fought over by Edgar Degas and Pierre-Auguste Renoir, with Degas as the victor, at Cézanne's first sale. In addition to the thirty-three works by Cézanne, including the watercolors, six oil paintings, six prints, and five drawings, the collection boasts seven paintings by Soutine, two each by Degas and Toulouse-Lautrec, and one each by van Gogh, Renoir, Camille Pissarro, Alfred Sisley, Gustave Courbet, Honoré Daumier, Édouard Manet, Maurice Utrillo, and Maurice Prendergast. Sculpture is represented through works by Paul Gauguin, Wilhelm Lehmbruck, Jacques Lipchitz, and Amedeo Modigliani, who is also represented by two oil paintings and one drawing. The one exception to the modern focus of the collection is an engraving by Albrecht Dürer, Adam and Eve. Henry Pearlman himself is represented by a bust by Giacomo Manzu and a portrait by Oskar Kokoschka.

The collection has been much exhibited, including an international tour in 2014-16 which included the Ashmolean Museum at Oxford University, where it was the museum's most popular exhibition on record, the Musée Granet in Aix-en-Provence, the High Museum of Art in Atlanta, and the Vancouver Art Gallery in Canada, ending at the Princeton University Art Museum, where the collection has been on long-term loan since 1976.

Media related to the Henry and Rose Pearlman Collection at Wikimedia Commons

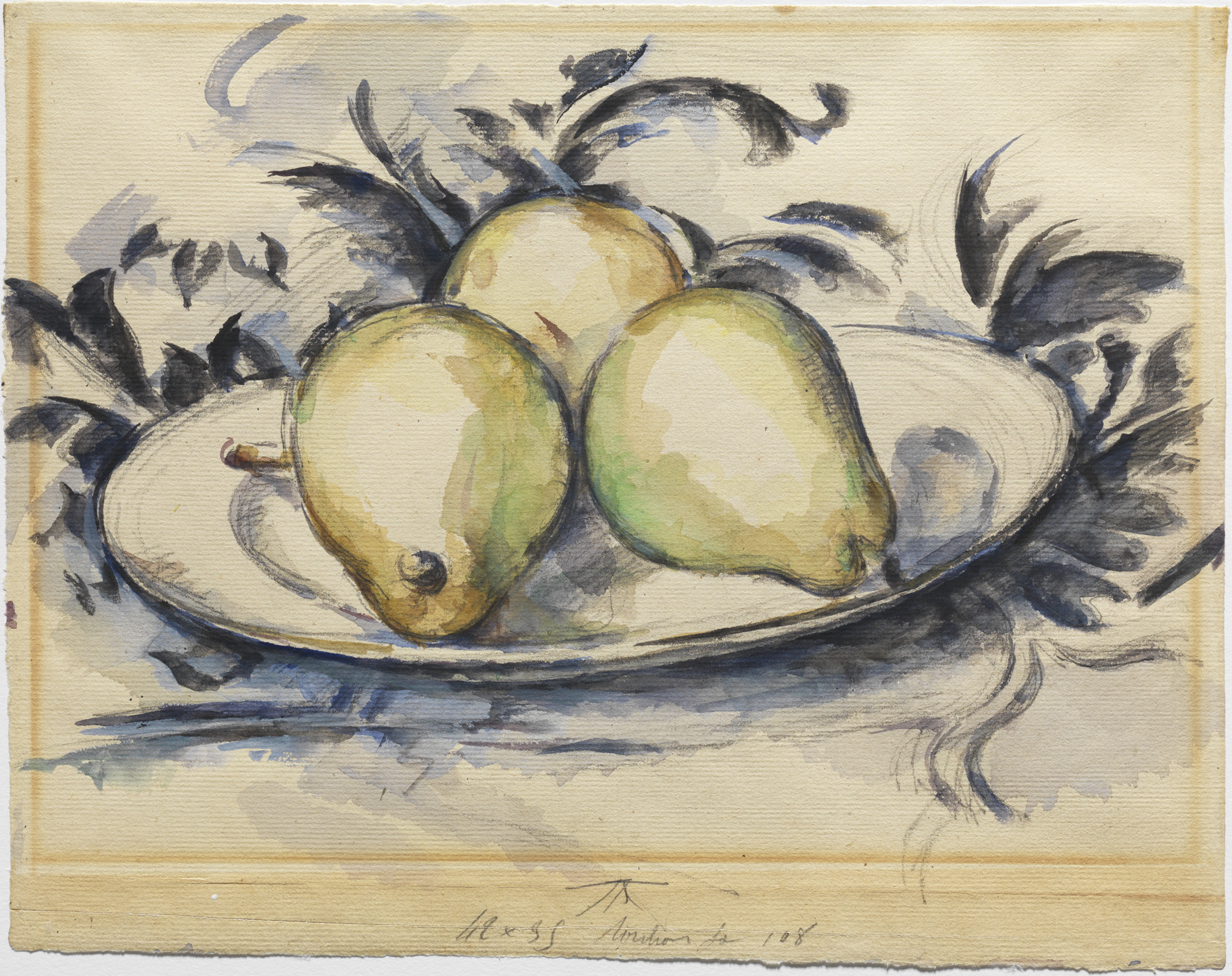
Paul Cézanne, Three Pears, ca. 1888-90

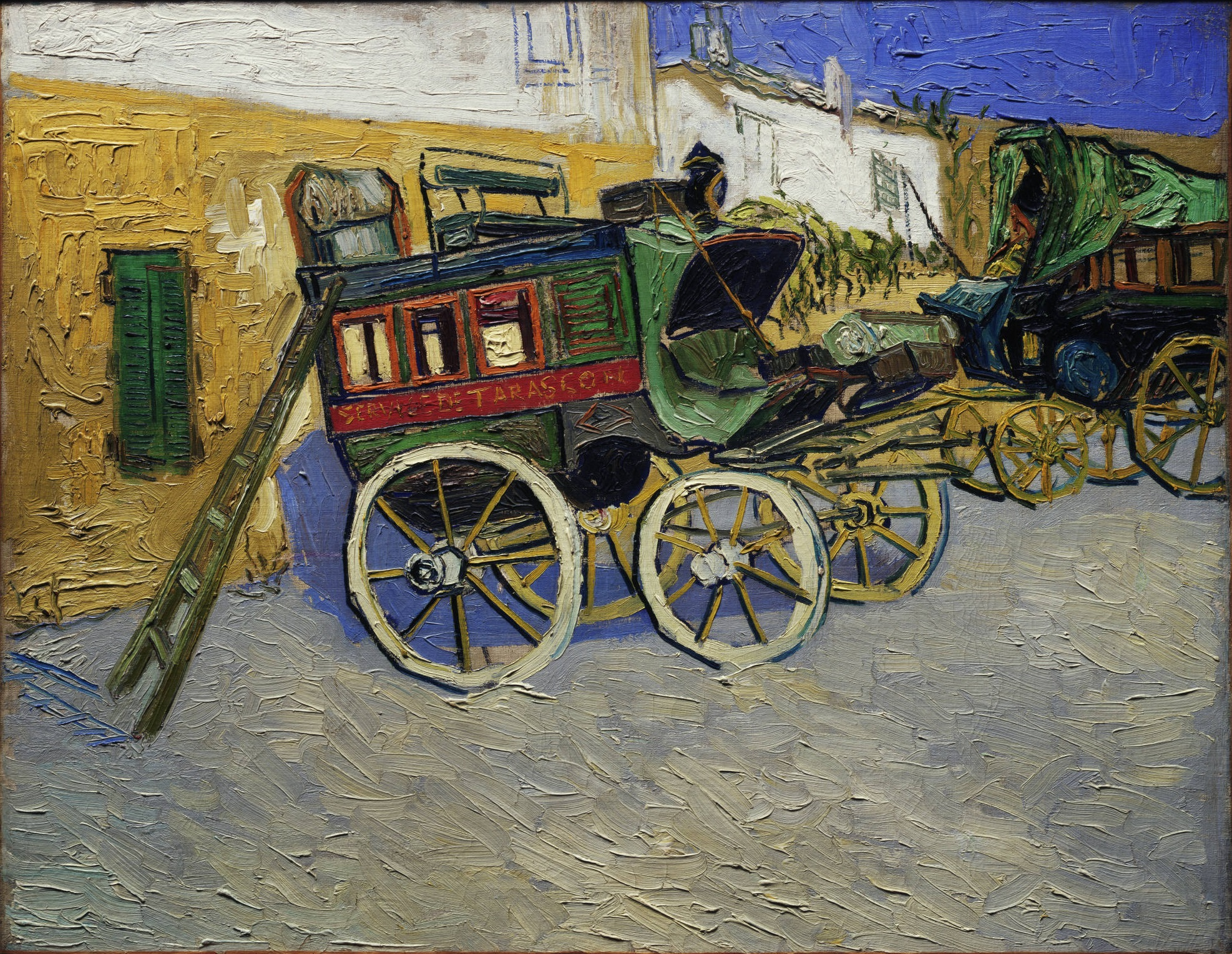
Vincent van Gogh, The Stagecoach to Tarascon, 1888

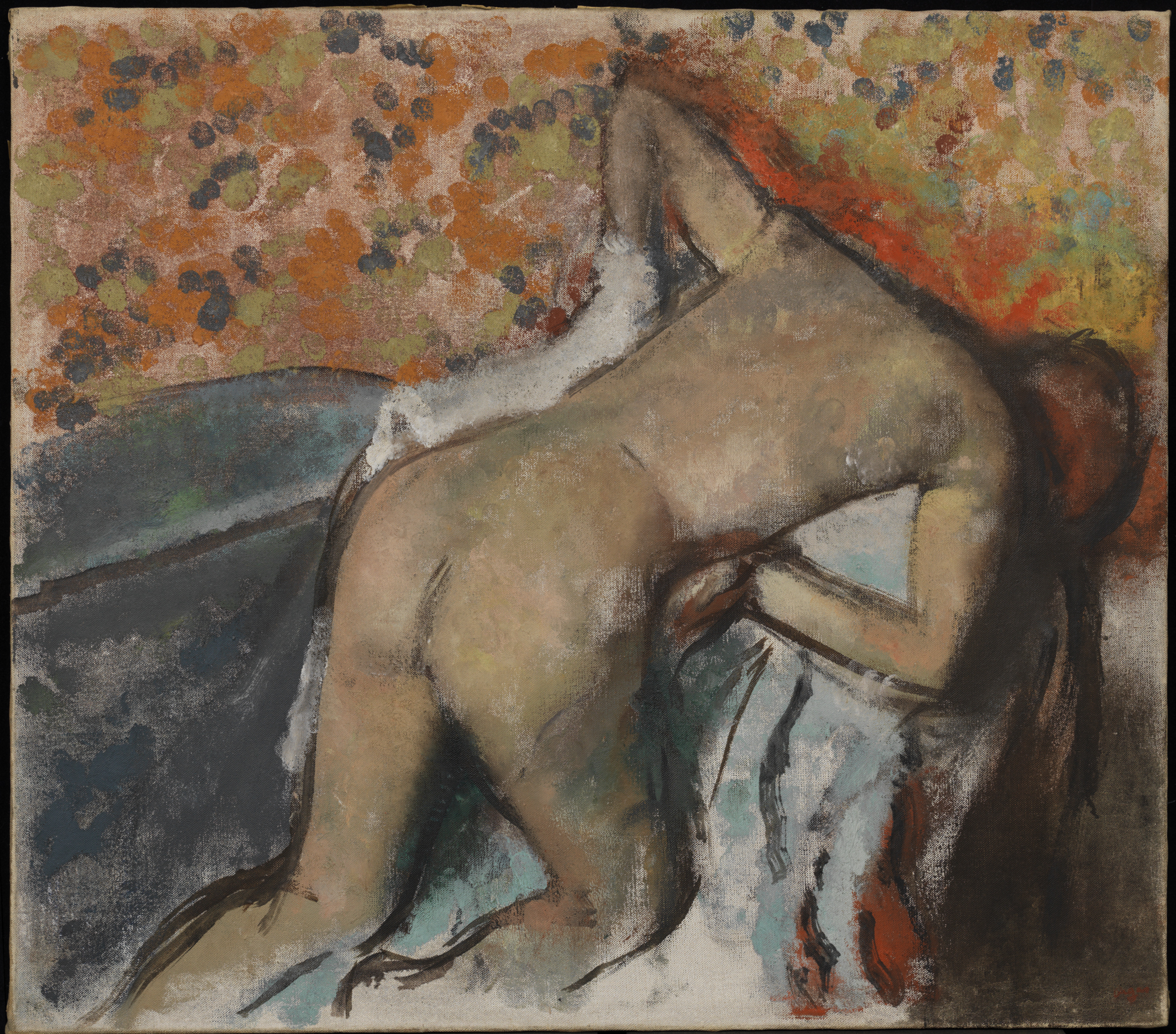
Edgar Degas, After the Bath, Woman Drying Herself, 1890s

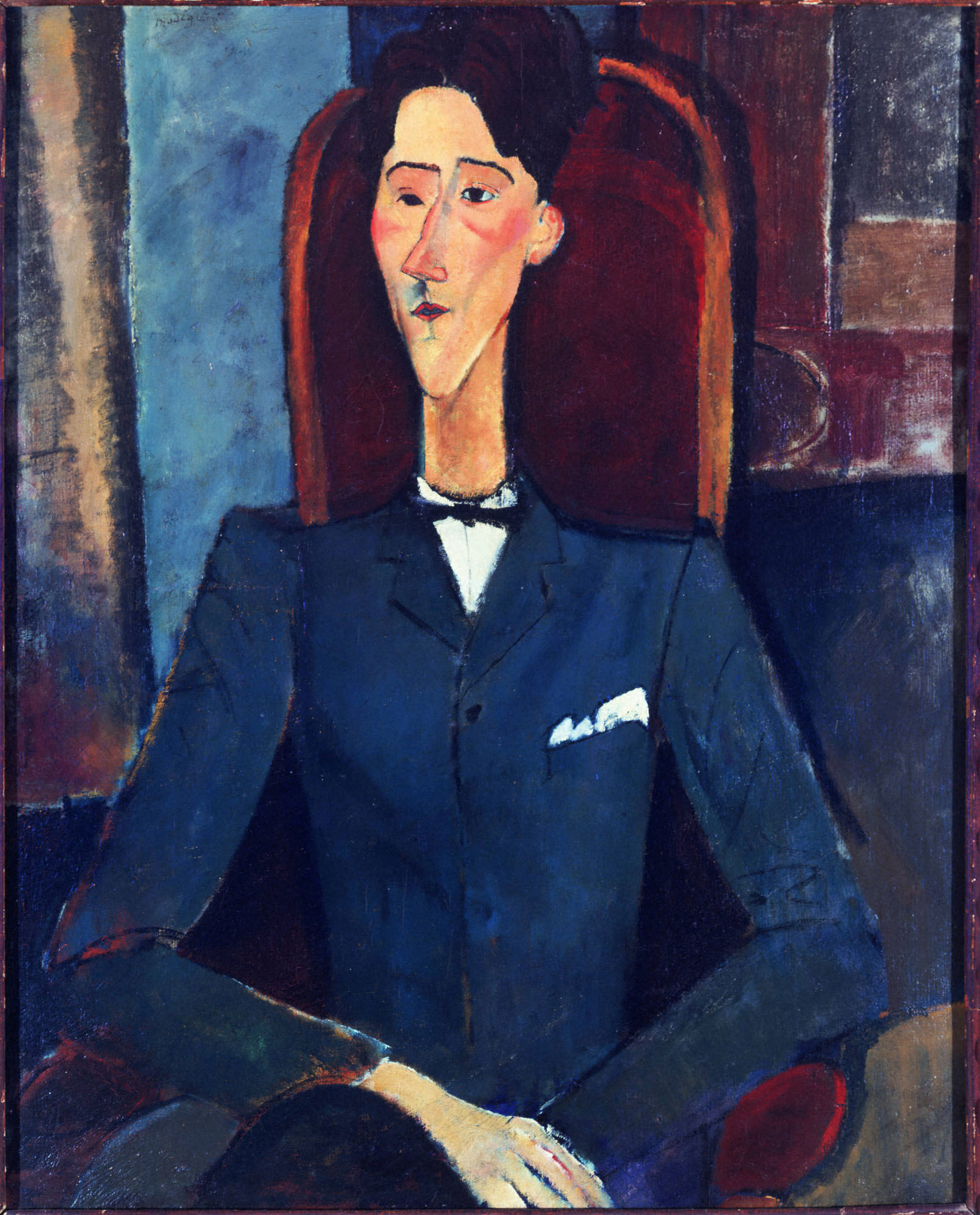
Amedeo Modigliani, Jean Cocteau, 1916

== Looted art controversies ==
On March 22, 2023, the Office of the Manhattan District Attorney was authorized to seize from the museum eleven items suspected of having been stolen and smuggled before the university acquired them. In 2024, 16 additional artifacts linked to alleged art smuggler and Princeton alumnus Edoardo Almagià were identified in the museum collection.

== Bibliography ==
- Antonaras, Anastassios (January 8, 2013). Fire and Sand: Ancient Glass in the Princeton University Art Museum. Princeton, NJ: Princeton University Art Museum. ISBN 978-0300179811.
- Banner, Lisa A. (2012). Spanish Drawings in the Princeton University Art Museum. Princeton, NJ: Princeton University Art Museum. ISBN 978-0300149319.
- Cézanne and the Modern: Masterpieces of European Art from the Pearlman Collection. Princeton, NJ: Princeton University Art Museum. December 30, 2013. ISBN 978-0300174403.
- Fong, Wen C. (1987). Images of the Mind: Selections from the Edward L. Elliott Family and John B. Elliott Collections of Calligraphy and Painting at the Art Museum, Princeton University. Princeton, NJ: Princeton University Art Museum. ISBN 978-0943012049.
- Giles, Laura M.; Van Cleave, Claire (May 20, 2014). Italian Master Drawings from the Princeton University Art Museum. Princeton, NJ: Princeton University Art Museum. ISBN 978-0300149326.
- Hughes, Michael (December 1, 2002). The Blair Bequest: Chinese Snuff Bottles from the Princeton University Art Museum. International Chinese Snuff Bottle Society. ISBN 978-9627502623.
- Kelleher, Patrick J. (1982). Living with Modern Sculpture: The John B. Putnam Jr. Memorial Collection. Princeton, NJ: Princeton University Art Museum.
- Pop Art: Contemporary Perspectives. Princeton, NJ: Princeton University Art Museum. 2007. ISBN 978-0300122121.
- Ridgway, Brunilde Sismondo (June 13, 1994). Greek Sculpture in The Art Museum, Princeton University. Princeton, NJ: Princeton University Art Museum. ISBN 978-0943012162.
- Steward, James Christen (2013). Princeton University Art Museum Handbook of the Collections Revised and Expanded Edition (2nd ed.). Princeton, NJ: Princeton University Art Museum. ISBN 978-0943012414.
- Wilmerding, John; Foster, Kathleen (October 11, 2004). American Art in the Princeton University Art Museum: Volume 1: Drawings and Watercolors. Princeton, NJ: Princeton University Art Museum. ISBN 978-0300106060.
