= Day for Night (festival) =

Art and music festival in Texas (2015–2017)

- Status: Not Active
- Genre: Multi-Genre
- Frequency: Annual
- Locations: Houston, Texas
- Country: United States
- Years active: 2015–2017
- Inaugurated: December 19, 2015
- Founder: Free Press Houston, Work-Order
- Most recent: December 17, 2017
- Attendance: 20,000+
- People: Producer: Omar Afra; Associate Producer: Marcus Gurske: Creative Directors: Kiffer Keegan Keira Alexandra: Curator: Alex Czetwertynski; General Manager: Marini van Smirren

Day for Night was an art and music festival in Houston, Texas that "explores the deep connections between light, technology, sound and space". Producer Omar Afra co-conceived the idea of a festival experience that would reintroduce visual art back into the musical experience on a large scale when Kiffer Keegan pitched the idea of including new media installations during preparations for Free Press Summer Festival 2014.

== Conception ==
Omar Afra and Work-Order partners Kiffer Keegan and Keira Alexandra conceptualized the idea for the unique event while working together on Free Press Summer Fest 2014. Their ideas for incorporating visual art with music didn't fit into the model of their already-existing annual music festival, Free Press Summer Fest. Borrowing from their past experience, they began work on Day for Night in the summer of 2015 and chose Alex Czetwertynski to be the [Visual Arts] Curator.

== Production ==
Day for Night showcased musicians and visual artists. The production layout varied each year depending on the venue. On average, there were 3-4 stages with musicians performing in tandem, and visual art displays throughout the venue. The lineup for musicians featured artists with a heavy emphasis on stage presence and performance regardless of notoriety or genre.

== 2015 ==
The festival took place in the six block area surrounding Silver Street Studios on December 19 through December 20, 2015. The event featured three stages for musical acts; the red stage featured the big-name acts, the green stage was for electronic or atmospheric acts, and the blue stage for the local or obscure acts. The art installations were set up in between the stages and throughout the venue. [Consequence of Sound]

=== Music lineup ===
Kendrick Lamar	New Order	Philip Glass Ensemble	Dillon Francis	Janelle Monáe	Flying Lotus
Elliphant	Battles (band)	Madeon	CocoRosie	Psychic TV	Death Grips	Jerk
Bart Black	Prismo	Nicolas Jaar	Dan Deacon	Mystikal	Com Truise
Cazwell	Amanda Lepore	Holly Herndon	Julien Bayle	Indian Jewelry	DJ FREDSTER
U.S. Girls	Jonte' Moaning	Prince Rama	Deru	Matt Thibideau	Roman GianArthur
Richard Ramirez	Christine Renee	Future Blondes	BOAN	Millennial Grave	Wrestlers
Children of Pop	B L A C K I E	Hearts of Animals	Josiah Gabriel	FLCON FCKER	Light Wheel	The Vanity

=== Digital artists ===
Casey Reas	Zach Lieberman	Refik Anadol	Markus Heckmann	Kamil Nawratil	Gabriel Pulecio
Vincent Howze w/AV&C	MASOMENOS	Mark Eats	NONOTAK	Alex Czetwertynski	Night Moves
Work-Order	NEIL EBBFLO

== 2016 ==
The festival took place at the Barbara Jordan Post office in downtown Houston on December 18–19.

=== Music lineup ===
Aphex Twin	ODESZA	Travis Scott	Kaskade	Bjork	Run The Jewels
RZA	Stone Mecca Rider	Nick Murphy (Chet Faker)	Butthole Surfers	Blood Orange	Little Dragon	Banks
The Jesus and Mary Chain	Squarepusher	Blonde Redhead	Thundercat	Kamasi Washington	Unknown Mortal Orchestra
John Carpenter	Washed Out	Ariel Pink	Lightning Bolt	Arca	Dj Windows 98
Oneohtrix Point Never	Liars	Lower Dens	S U R V I V E	Matmos	Clams Casino
Mykki Blanco	Marcel Khalife	Chelsea Wolfe	Uncle Acid & The Deadbeats	Welcome to Houston	SG Lewis
SOPHIE	Tobacco	Nothing	Soulection	Mary Lattimore and Jeff Zeigler	Fat Tony
Jock Club	Wild Moccasins	Buoyant Spirit	Vacation Eyes	Limb	Hevin
-Us.	Jerk	MNYNMS	Maramuresh	Pfaff	Splendid Emblem	Tycho
Kult Dizney	DIVISION	Night Drive	Josh Dupont	From Beyond	Futurelix	Daed
Light Wheel	Anklepants	Kam Franklin	Spit Mask	Daughters	Tee Vee	Herman Kolgen

=== Digital artists ===
United Visual Artists (UVA)	Bjork Digital	Golan Levin	NONOTAK	Shoplifter	Tundra
Robert Seidel	Damien Echols	AV&C + Houzé	Michael Fullman	Ezra Miller	Jesse Kanda
Alex Czetwertynsk	Herman Kolgen

== 2017 ==
The festival took place at the Barbara Jordan Post office in downtown Houston on December 15–17.

=== Music lineup ===
Nine Inch Nails	Thom Yorke	Solange	Justice	St. Vincent	Tyler, The Creator
Kaytranada	Earl Sweatshirt	James Blake	Pretty Lights	Jamie XX	Phantogram
Saint Heron	Jenny Hval	Boots	Pussy Riot	The Jesus Lizard	Nina Kraviz
Godspeed You! Black Emperor	REZZ	Laurie Anderson	Cashmere Cat	Cardi B	Perfume Genius
Sky Ferreira	En Vogue	Lil B	Of Montreal	Venetian Snares x Daniel Lanois	Ryoji Ikeda
Princess Nokia	Kimbra	Mount Kimbie	Corbin	Shlohmo	The Album Leaf
DJ Tennis	Tim Hecker	Forest Swords	BabyFather	G Jones	Shabazz Palaces
Andy Stott	Jessy Lanza	Roni Size	Jlin	Priests	Bjarki
Demdike Stare	Saro	Rabit X House Of Kenzo	B L A C K I E	Marcus Marr	Hoodcelebrity
Faten Kanaan	True American (band)	Pearl Crush	Deep Cuts	Tyler Barber	N N O A
Santa Muerte	Kona FM	Narcons	Acid Jeep	Hescher	Tearz	XLX	Miguel Flaco	Collin Hedrick

=== Digital artists ===
Ryoji Ikeda	Mathewe Schreiber	Conditional Studio + Processing Foundation	James Clar	Felicie D'Estienne D'Orves	Kyle Mcdonald + Jonas Jongejan
Ryoichi Kurokawa	Radio Soulwax	VT Pro	Hovver	The Mill (post-production)	Freeka Tet
Playmodes	Theodore Fivel + Freeka Tet	Ekene Ijeoma	Cocolab	Sam Cannon	Vincent Moon + Priscilla Telmon	Lina Dib

== Controversy ==
After allegations of sexual misconduct with two women by festival founder Omar Afra emerged in August, 2018, the festival cut ties with Afra and foreclosed on the festival-owning entity, removing him from any involvement or ownership. An open records request from Houston Police Department summarized the incident by stating "No injuries, No evidence, No arrest." Afra denied the allegations and called them "patently false."

On November 26, 2018, an auction was held for Afra's ownership stake, due to an unfulfilled loan agreement. The ownership stake was sold to FPH Chicken Holdings, who were owed the debt. They intend to pursue additional legal action for the remaining $670,000 owed. FPH Chicken Holdings is now the sole owner of the entity that owns both Free Press Summer Fest and Day for Night. Afra additionally cut ties with Free Press Houston. The festival did not take place in 2018 and it is unclear if it will be held again.
