= Bayou City Art Festival =

Arts festival held in Houston, Texas

The Bayou City Art Festival (formerly the Westheimer Colony Art Festival) is an arts festival held biannually by the Art Colony Association in Houston, Texas. The festival is held in Memorial Park in the spring and in Downtown Houston in the fall.

The Art Colony Association originated in 1971, when it was known as the Westheimer Colony Association. A collective effort of Lower Westheimer businesses formed an arts & crafts gathering as part of a beautification of the neighborhood, where the Westheimer Colony Art Festival was born. The art festival included a juried art exhibit featuring works from artists both local and national, and the proceeds from the art exhibit benefited Houston-based charities, community organizations and arts groups, such as the High School for the Performing and Visual Arts.

Shortly after the art festival began, a collective street fair evolved around its grounds which would later become the Westheimer Street Festival. By the late 1980s, the Westheimer Art Festival began to distance itself from the growing street festival, eventually resulting in a legal dispute in 1992 between the Westheimer Colony Association and the organizers of the street festival over the rights of The Original Westheimer Street Fest Inc. and the community organizers to charge an admission fee.

In 1993, the Westheimer Art Festival moved from its Montrose/Neartown venue on Westheimer Road to a Downtown location on Main Street and Calhoun. By 1997, the festival debuted as the Bayou City Art Festival at the Memorial Park location for its spring event, and the Westheimer Colony Association had changed its name to the Art Colony Association.

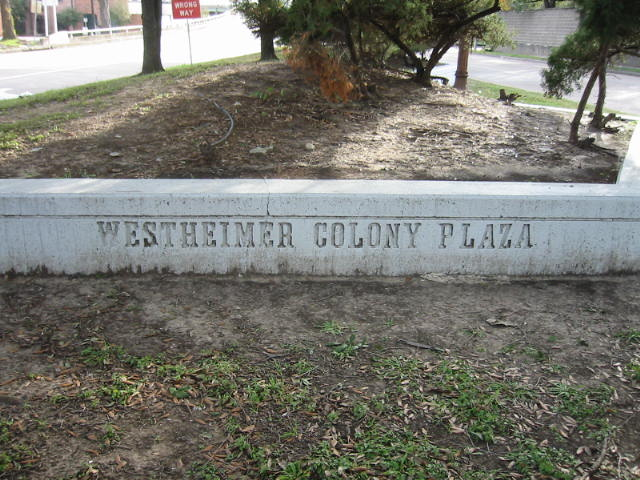
Westheimer Colony Plaza

2020's festival will be virtual caused by the COVID-19 pandemic.

== Trivia ==
At the crossroads where Westheimer becomes Elgin in Midtown Houston, there is a small plaza where northbound Spur 527 becomes Brazos Street. Sandwiched between Brazos and Bagby, the plaza is known as the Westheimer Colony Plaza.

To Houstonians, the Bayou City Art Festival (which had its origins as the Westheimer Colony Art Festival) has grown out of its Neartown roots to become a citywide gathering.

Since 2005, Sam Houston Park was the venue of the fall festival due to the reconstruction of Smith Street.

In June 2005, a revival of the former Westheimer Colony Art Festival took place during Gay Pride Weekend. The revived art gathering was known as the Westheimer Arts Festival. The pluralization of the word "arts" came from the informal name given to the Westheimer Colony Art Festival by festivalgoers—the Westheimer Arts Festival has no relationship with the Bayou City Art Festival promoters or Art Colony Association. This also holds true for the latest incarnation of the former Westheimer Street Festival initially as WestFest Compressed, which evolved into the Westheimer Block Party.
