= Thelastplaceyoulook =

American rock band

thelastplaceyoulook
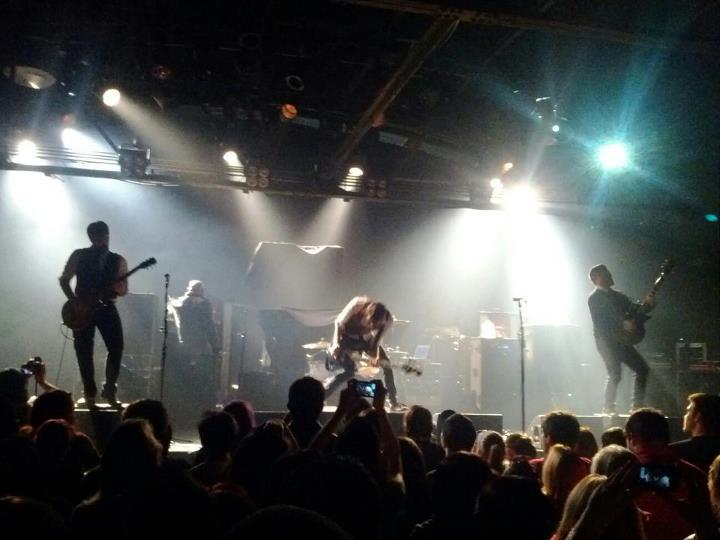
- thelastplaceyoulook performing in Houston, TX

Background information
- Origin: Houston, Texas, United States
- Genres: Alternative rock Hard rock Post-grunge; Post-emo
- Years active: 2006-Present
- Label: Independent
- Members: Justin Nava; Kevin Pool; Richard Sherwood; Mikey Garcia
- Past members: Andy Moths; Derek Young
- Website: www.thelastplaceyoulookonline.com

thelastplaceyoulook is an American rock band that formed in Houston, Texas. Their debut extended play, The Lies We Tell Ourselves, was released on 30 May 2006. This was followed up with the debut of their first full-length album See The Light Inside You, on 29 January 2009, which featured singles "Don't Make It So Easy" and "Band to Save Me". The band has also released a music video and single of "Do You Hear?" a cover of the Christmas song "Do You Hear What I Hear?". In December 2013, they released their second extended play Rip It Out.

== History ==
=== Origins, The Lies We Tell Ourselves (2006) ===
In 2006 singer Justin Nava formed thelastplaceyoulook with friends Kevin Pool, Richard Sherwood, Derek Young and Andy Moths. Their EP, The Lies We Tell Ourselves, was released on 30 May 2006. Following the release of The Lies We Tell Ourselves, they entered into the studio in 2008 and began work on their follow-up album. In 2009, the band released their full-length debut See The Light Inside You.

=== See The Light Inside You, member changes (2009–2010) ===
With See The Light Inside You, Space City Rock stated that the musical direction of the band took a different turn from their previous work.

The first music video for the single "Don't Make It So Easy" was produced by Taylor Gahm and released on 13 July 2009. Since then, the second single "Band to Save Me" has been added to regular rotation on Clear Channel's 94.5 KTBZ The Buzz. The band has also been spotlighted by media outlets such as Audio ADD and the Houston Press.

During this time the band parted ways with drummer Andy Moths. Both sides have stated it was a mutual amicable parting due to creative differences and what was best for everyone involved.

=== Awards, touring, music videos (2010–2011) ===
The band toured throughout 2010, while continuing to write new material for their upcoming album, as well as searching for a full-time replacement drummer. After touring with several interim drummers, Mikey Garcia was added as the band's permanent drummer.

thelastplaceyoulook were nominated for the 2009 Houston Press Music Awards ("Rock", "Best Male Vocals", "Best Drummer", and "Best Local Song", for "Don't Make It So Easy") and the 2010 Texas Buzz Awards. In 2011, the band were again nominated by the Houston Press for the 2011 Music Awards ("Rock," "Best Male Vocals," "Best Songwriter," "Best Drummer," and "Best Song" for "Band to Save Me"). In June 2011, the band won a Houston Web Award for "Best Use of Facebook by a Band or Musician". On 16 November 2011 the band won two Houston Press Music Awards in the "Best Rock" and "Best Male Vocals" categories.

In September 2011 they played at the first annual Houston Press BestFest alongside Cake and The Toadies. In October 2011 they played the mainstage at Buzzfest XXVII at the Cynthia Woods Mitchell Pavilion alongside the likes of Staind and Bush. The band also co-headlined the 2011 Houston Press Music Awards Showcase in November 2011.

The music video for "Band to Save Me" was released on 5 September 2011. The band released their newest single on iTunes on 7 December 2011, with subsequent music video; a cover of the Christmas song Do You Hear What I Hear?.

=== Rip It Out, national tours (2012–present) ===
The band began the 2012 year with a series of shows with Theory of a Deadman and playing alongside the likes of Snoop Dogg and The Avett Brothers at Free Press Summer Fest in June 2012. In Fall 2012 the band embarked on the 'Cutting Like Knives' national tour with 10 Years and The Red Jumpsuit Apparatus.

The band once again returned to Buzzfest XXIX in October 2012. Soon after, they returned to the studio to begin work on their next album. The first single "Rip It Out" was recorded, with several other songs in the production and recording phases. The band has given away advance copies of "Rip It Out" as part of ongoing band contests, as well as adding the song in frequent rotation during live shows. The single "Band to Save Me" was also featured on Escaping The Ordinary's compilation album, Escaping The Ordinary: Volume Two.

Throughout 2013 the band debuted a number of new songs in production at live shows, including "Sexytime," "Ebb And Flow," and "Awake." Sexytime has received frequent broadcast on Houston's 94.5 KTBZ The Buzz. Also frequently played live is a new rock cover of Adele's "Rolling in the Deep", as well as Miley Cyrus' Wrecking Ball. In Fall 2013, the band embarked on a national tour with Blue October, 'Sway,' in support of Blue October's new album of the same name. In December 2013 the band released their latest extended play Rip It Out, which is expected to accompany a 2014 tour. In July 2014, guitarist Derek Young left the band.

== Members ==
=== Current ===
- Justin Nava – vocals (2006–present)
- Kevin Pool – bass & vocals (2006–present)
- Richard Sherwood – guitar (2006–present)
- Mikey Garcia – drums (2010–present)

=== Former ===
- Derek Young – guitar (2006–2014)
- Andy Moths – drums (2006–2010)

== Discography ==
Year	Album details
2006	The Lies We Tell Ourselves: Released: 30 May 2006; Label: Independent; Format: CD, DI
2009	See The Light Inside You: Released: 20 January 2009; Label: Independent; Format: CD, DI
2013	Rip It Out: Released: 20 December 2013; Label: Independent; Format: CD, DI

== Music videos ==
Year	Song	Director
2009	"Don't Make It So Easy"	Taylor Gahm
2011	"Band to Save Me"(Live)	Nelson Lopez
2011	"Do You Hear?"	thelastplaceyoulook
2013	"Rip It Out"	Brian Vogel
