= Free Press Summer Fest =

Music festival held in Houston, Texas

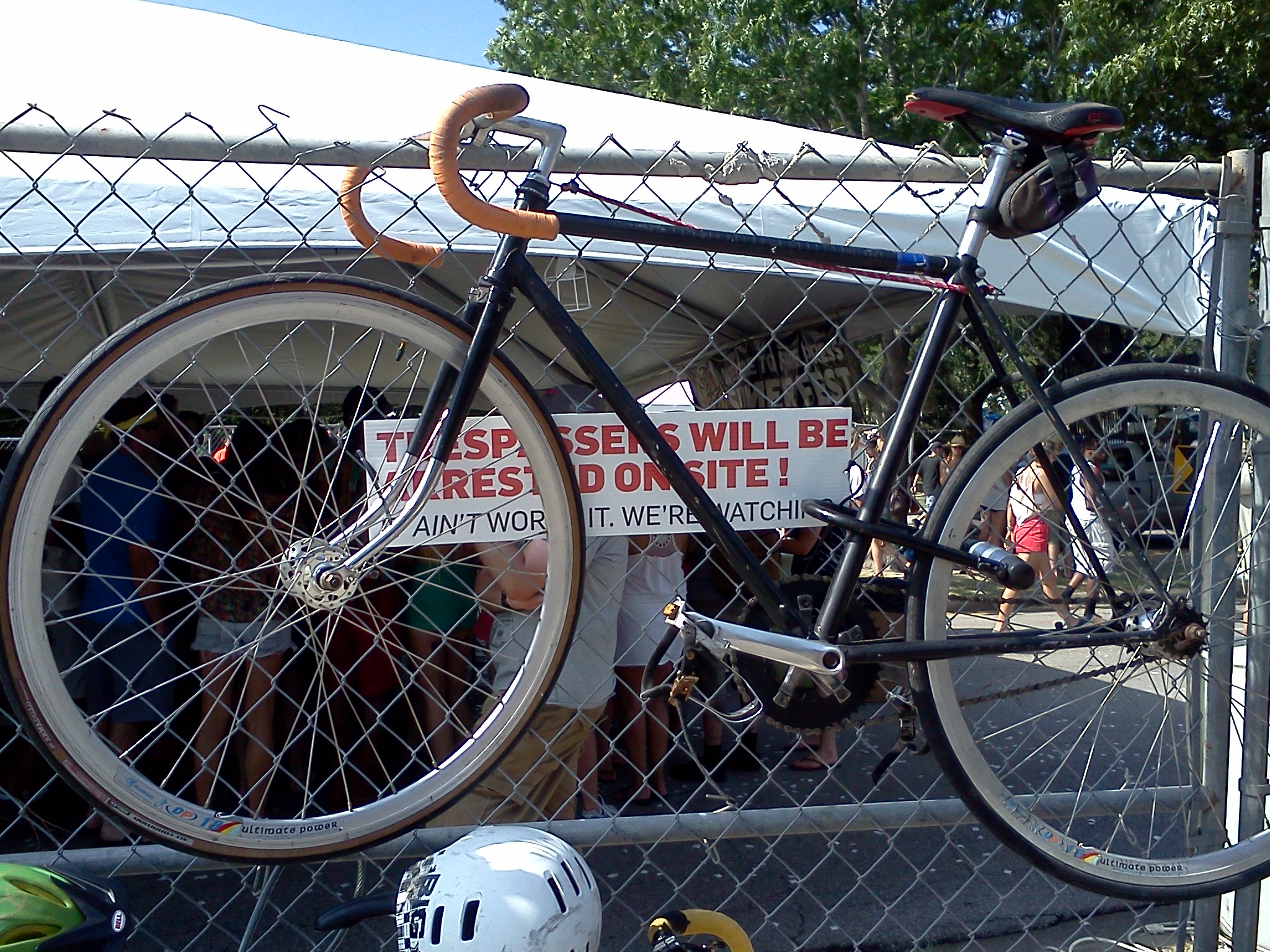
- A bicycle hangs on a fence at the 2012 Free Press Summer Festival in Houston
- Genre: Folk, country, blues, folk rock, indie folk, alternative rock, hip hop, EDM
- Dates: First week in June
- Frequency: Annually
- Locations: Eleanor Tinsley Park, Houston, Texas, U.S.
- Inaugurated: August 2009
- Most recent: June 2017
- Attendance: 100,000+
- Patron: Free Press Houston
- Website: fpsf.com

The Free Press Summer Festival was an annual two-day music festival held in Houston at Buffalo Bayou's Eleanor Tinsley Park. Other activities include fireworks, interactive art installations, a paint slide, music workshops, a 30-foot water wall and an off-site after party.

The festival was started to publicize local musical performers, visual arts, and artists. A recycling program, carbon offset credits, and a partnership with the Texas Campaign for the Environment were implemented help this festival become a greener experience.

The festival was organized by Free Press Houston, a local independent newspaper and Pegstar.net Presents, a local concert promotion company.

On November 30, 2017, the promoters of Free Press Houston and Austin City Limits revealed that the festival would return in Houston on March 24 and 25, 2018 under a new name, the In Bloom Music Festival. The announcement coincided exactly with the ninth anniversary of FPSF. In January 2019, it was later confirmed that no further edition of the In Bloom Music Festival would take place.

== Environment ==
A recycling plan (with assistance from Little Joy Recycling) sorted aluminum, plastic, paper and glass. A free bottle of water was given to anyone who recycled 10 plastic bottles. All carbon output was balanced with carbon offset credits. Carpooling and bicycling to the festival were encouraged. Over 2000 attendees biked to the 2009 festival.

== Fancy Pants Tent ==
In February 2011, a new pass was introduced which granted access to a premium side stage viewing area and entry to a limited access electronic music tent. The Fancy Pants Tent was intended to host exclusive performances by electronic musicians and provide complimentary bar drinks and hors d'œuvres, free massages in addition to meet and greets.

Complaints about the cost led festival organizers to remove the Fancy Pants ticket tier in April 2011 and announced that all festival attendees would be able to watch the Fancy Pants acts.

== History ==
=== 2009 ===
The 2009 festival was held August 8–9 with an attendance of approximately 30,000. A portion of the proceeds went to Project Row Houses (a community non-profit responsible for restoration, art and social activism in Houston's Third Ward since 1991).

The lineup for FPSF 2009 was:

- American Fangs
- B L A C K I E Vs. Cop Warmth
- Broken Social Scene
- Buxton
- Ceeplus Bad Knives
- Chase Hamblin
- Come See My Dead Person
- Devin The Dude
- Eastern Sea
- Explosions In The Sky
- Fat Tony
- Ghosttown Electric
- Grandfather Child
- Grrrl Parts
- H.I.S.D
- Hearts Of Animals
- I Am Mesmer
- Los Skarnales
- The Manichean
- Mechanical Boy
- Muhammidali
- News On The March
- O Pioneers!
- The Octopus Project
- of Montreal
- Perseph One
- Prince Paul
- Riff Tiffs
- Riverboat Gamblers
- Ryan Scroggins And Trenchtown Texans
- Scale The Summit
- Sideshow Tramps
- Skyblue72
- The Small Sounds
- Southern Backtones
- The Sword
- Tha Fucking Transmissions
- The Tontons
- Ume
- The Watermarks
- What Made Milwaukee Famous
- Wild Moccasins
- Young Mammals

Peekaboo Theory Band

=== 2010 ===
The 2010 festival was held June 5–6 with an attendance of over 45,000. A portion of the proceeds went to Buffalo Bayou Partnership (a non-profit corporation that develops and facilitates improvements to the Buffalo Bayou greenway system).

The lineup for FPSF 2010 was:

- The Flaming Lips
- 30 Foot Fall
- American Fangs
- B L A C K I E
- Black Congress
- Buxton
- Ceeplus Bad Knives
- Chase Hamblin
- Check Other
- Cro Mags
- Damon Allen
- Dayta
- Dead Prez
- Detroit Cobras
- Dissent
- DJ Czech One
- DJ Jester
- DJ Richard Gear
- Eastern Sea
- Elaine Greer
- Fat Tony
- Fredster
- G.Wizz
- Ghost Mountain
- Giant Princess
- Girl Talk
- Givers
- Golden Axe
- Grandfather Child
- Grrrl Parts
- Guerilla Foco Clan
- Hell City Kings
- Hollywood Floss
- I Am Mesmer
- Johnny Moon
- Kid Sister
- Leg Sweeper
- Lucero
- Lymbyc Systym
- The Mahas
- The Manichean
- Medeski Martin And Wood
- Mix Master Mike
- Muhammadali
- Municipal Waste
- Neiliyo
- Perseph One
- Prince Klassen
- Ra Ra Riot
- Robert Ellis
- Rusted Shut
- Saviors
- Sharks And Sailors
- Shina Rae
- Sideshow Tramps
- Slim Thug
- The Small Sounds
- Somosuno
- The Sour Notes
- Stars
- Sugar And Gold
- The Takes
- Uh Huh Her
- Wild Moccasins
- Yippa
- Young Mammals

=== 2011 ===
The festival was held June 4–5, 2011 with a two-day attendance of over 60,000. A portion of the proceeds went to Houston Tomorrow (a nonprofit organization founded in 1998 to explore urban issues and to inform the discussion of growth in the Houston region).

The lineup for FPSF 2011 was:

- Weezer
- The Avett Brothers
- Acephalix
- American Fangs
- Amplified Heat
- Ani Difranco's Dick
- The Annoysters
- Art Institute Limited
- Arthur Yoria
- The Back Pockets
- B L A C K I E
- Beirut
- Big Boi
- Bigbang
- The Black Angels
- Black Congress
- The Black Dahlia Murder
- Black Leather Jesus
- Bun B
- Buxton
- By The End Of Tonight
- Cavernous
- Chromeo
- Clockpole
- Co-Pilot
- Copwarmth
- Cut Copy
- Dead Revolt
- Defending The Kingdom
- Delicious Milk
- Disfrutalo!
- Eastern Sea
- Espantapajaros
- Eternal Summers
- Eyes Burn Electric
- Featherface
- Female Demand
- Finnegan
- Free Radicals
- Fresh Millions
- Fucked Up
- Generation:Landslide!
- Giant Battle Monster
- Giant Princess
- Glasnost
- Gorealah Soul
- Grandfather Child
- The Grass Skirts
- The Handshake
- The Hates
- Hayes Carll
- Indian Jewelry
- Iron Age
- Jody Seabody And The Whirls
- Junior Brown
- Kylesa
- Leg Sweeper
- Limb
- Linus Pauling Quartet
- Los Skarnales
- Lower Dens
- The Mahas
- The Manichean
- The Memorials
- Muhammadali
- Neon Indian
- Niceguys
- Nosaprise
- Organ Failure
- Pasadena Napalm Division
- Perseph One
- Poopy Lungstuffing
- Protomen
- RIVERS
- Robert Ellis
- Roky Moon And Bolt
- The Roller
- Romulus Ate
- Rusted Shut
- Sharon Jones
- Sideshow Tramps
- Simple Success
- Sings
- Somosuno
- The Sour Notes
- State Vs Judd Nelson
- Tax The Wolf
- Tha Phoundation
- Thavius Beck
- The Ton Tons
- Those Darlins
- Thunderkunt
- Tobacco
- Undergang
- Venemous Maximus
- Vincent Priceless
- Vivian Pikkles And The Sweethearts Uber-Alles
- The Watermarks
- Ween
- Weird Party
- Wicked Poseur
- Wild Mocassins
- Woozy Helmet
- Yeasayer
- Young Girls
- Young Mammals
- Zeale
- Z-Ro

=== 2012 ===
The festival was held June 2–3, 2012 with an estimated attendance of 92,000. Tickets for FPSF 2012 ranged in price from $75 to $115.

The lineup was:

- The Avett Brothers
- Snoop Dogg
- Willie Nelson
- Afrojack
- The Flaming Lips (performing "The Dark Side of the Moon")
- Primus
- Descendents
- Major Lazer
- Young The Giant
- Pretty Lights
- Portugal. The Man
- Two Door Cinema Club
- Z-Ro
- Morris Day and the Time
- Best Coast
- Fitz and the Tantrums
- Diplo
- Shabazz Palaces
- Starfucker
- Danny Brown
- JEFF the Brotherhood
- Wallpaper.
- Turquoise Jeep
- Clap Your Hands Say Yeah
- Maps & Atlases
- Fatal Flying Guilloteens
- Valient Thorr
- Big Freedia
- Touché Amoré
- Erykah Badu
- Phantogram
- Ume
- Quintron and Miss Pussycat
- David Garza
- Ancient Wisdom
- Robert Ellis
- Girl in a Coma
- What Made Milwaukee Famous
- Electric Touch
- Quiet Corral
- R3hab
- Ponderosa
- Quintino, Shermanology
- Bad Veins
- Dry the River
- Fat Tony
- MC BuDa LoVe
- Grandfather Child
- Riff Tiffs
- David Liebe Hart
- Venomous Maximus
- Papermoons
- Bobby Burns
- Tontons
- Sister Crayon
- Freakouts
- Wild Moccasins
- Featherface
- Glasnost
- Suraj K
- Vanaprasta
- Harts of Oak
- Second Lovers
- The Sour Notes
- Journey Agents
- Suite 709
- Sundress
- Last Year's Men
- Ceeplus Bad Knives
- Square and Compass
- Big Sleep
- DJ Ebonix
- A Sea Es
- Brains for Dinner
- Tyagaraja
- JOn Black
- Espantapajaros
- Love Horse
- Sideshow Tramps
- Chelsea Wolfe
- Ashes of Babylon
- Small Sounds
- thelastplaceyoulook
- Electric Primadonnas
- Roky Moon and BOLT!
- Eastern Sea
- LIMB
- The Watermarks
- Bang Bangz
- Black Coffee
- Bart Black
- DJ Bizz
- The Manichean
- East Cameron Folkcore
- G. Wizz
- Bombon
- Los Skarnales
- DJ FREDster
- Pale, DJ SUN & Resolution
- The Wheel Workers
- Immigrant Punk
- Grass Skirts
- Rusted Shut
- Future Blonds
- Black Leather Jesus
- Giant Battle Monster
- Escatones
- Papaya
- Clockpole
- Lazer Cun*zz
- Jody Seabody and the Whirls
- Poopy Lungstuffing
- Annoysters
- GoREALah Soul
- Demonic Hen
- Black Magic Marker
- Anarchitex
- Darwin's Finches
- Muzak John
- Quiet Company
- New York City Queens
- Eyes Burn Electric
- Zlam Dunk
- Caddywhompus
- Zorch

=== 2013 ===
The festival was held on June 1–2, 2013 in Eleanor Tinsley Park. This marks the festival's first sold-out edition.

The lineup was:

- The Postal Service
- Bassnectar
- Iggy and The Stooges
- Passion Pit
- TV on the Radio
- Social Distortion
- Calvin Harris
- Alabama Shakes
- Gogol Bordello
- Of Monsters and Men
- Macklemore and Ryan Lewis
- Geto Boys
- 2 Chainz
- Cat Power
- Arctic Monkeys
- Japandroids
- Machine Gun Kelly
- The Bronx
- A Place to Bury Strangers
- A Sea Es
- American Fangs
- Ashes Of Babylon
- Baroness
- The Beans
- Blackmarket Syndicate
- Borgore
- Born Again Virgins
- Brandon West and The Black Hats
- Buxton
- Chairlift
- Chase Hamblin & The Roustabouts
- Chin Xaou Ti Won
- Dawes
- Deep Cuts
- Devin the Dude
- Disco Daddies
- DJ SUN
- Doughbeezy
- dUNETX
- Emily Bell
- Forced FEM
- Free Rads 2nd Line
- G.Wizz
- Grace Potter and the Nocturnals
- Half Moon Run
- The Head and The Heart
- Hello Chief
- Infinite Apaches
- Jandek
- Kitty Pryde
- LA Catrin & The Dem Damn Dames
- Los Amigos Invisibles
- Matt & Kim
- The Mavericks
- Mavis Staples
- The Men
- Midnight Norma Lane
- Mikey & the Drags
- Milo Greene
- Mord Fustang
- The Niceguys
- Nick Greer & The G's
- The Octopus Project
- Omatai
- Orents Stirner
- Otenki
- Paul Banks (from Interpol)
- Paul Wall
- Quad City DJ's
- RIVERS
- Savoy
- Showers
- Snow In Texas
- SOJA
- The Sour Notes
- The Suffers
- Super Mash Bros
- TRVP LORDZ ft. BUDA LOVE
- Ume
- UZOY
- Vintage Trouble
- Young Mammals

=== 2014 ===
The 2014 festival was held on May 31 - June 1, 2014.

The venue was closed and the first day was evacuated at about 1:00pm due to bad weather and lightning. Many acts were bumped or rescheduled with no notice when gates were rumored to be reopened at 3:30pm. Upon return many acts had sound trouble. Weather and construction at the park caused many stages to be moved to the Allen Parkway tarmac, often creating congestion and competing for sound. Partial refunds were not offered.

The 2014 FPSF lineup consisted of:

- Jack White
- Vampire Weekend
- Zedd
- Ms. Lauryn Hill
- Above & Beyond
- Wu-Tang Clan
- Edward Sharpe And The Magnetic Zeros
- Dwight Yoakam
- Childish Gambino
- Deftones
- Cage The Elephant
- The Kills
- Die Antwoord
- Big Gigantic
- Chvrches
- DMX
- Tune-Yards
- Laidback Luke
- Rebelution
- Washed Out
- The Naked and Famous
- Adventure Club
- Flosstradamus
- Drive-By Truckers
- Lord Huron
- Ying Yang Twins
- Sky Ferreira
- J. Roddy Walston & the Business
- First Aid Kit (band)
- Mariachi El Bronx
- Paper Diamond
- King Khan & The Shrines
- Flatbush Zombies
- The Oh Hellos
- Shakey Graves
- Wildcat! Wildcat!
- Poolside
- Robert DeLong
- The Orwells
- Anamanaguchi
- Drew Holcomb & The Neighbors
- The Chain Gang of 1974
- William Fitzsimmons
- Destruction Unit
- White Sea
- Uh Huh Her
- Jana Hunter
- The Tontons
- Syd Arthur
- Lizzo
- Benjamin Booker
- Bagheera
- Wild Moccasins
- Ishi
- Feathers
- A Fistful of Soul
- Yung Slutty
- Eagle Claw
- Venomous Maximus
- Wild Party
- Carnival Talk
- Driver Friendly
- BLSHS
- The Caldwell
- Pleasure 2
- Children of Pop
- Los Skarnales
- New York City Queens
- De'Wayne Jackson
- Make
- Another Run
- Gracie Chavez
- Pinkish Black
- Dead Roses
- Grand Old Grizzly
- Ill Liad

=== 2015 ===
The 2015 festival was held on June 6–7, 2015.

The lineup was:

- Skrillex ft Dotus
- R. Kelly
- Weezer
- Steve Angello
- Major Lazer
- Ben Harper & the Innocent Criminals
- St. Vincent
- Flume
- The Decemberists
- Belle and Sebastian
- Mastodon
- Chance the Rapper
- Tears for Fears
- Band of Horses
- Welcome to Houston featuring Bun B, Slim Thug, Devin The Dude, Z-Ro, Paul Wall, Mike Jones, Scarface, Lil' Flip, Lil' Keke, and The Suffers
- Gary Clark Jr.
- Charli XCX
- Flogging Molly
- Sturgill Simpson
- G-Eazy
- RL Grime
- Brandi Carlile
- Odesza
- Future Islands
- Tove Lo
- Rocket from the Crypt
- Lecrae
- Portugal. The Man
- Tycho
- GTA
- Glass Animals
- Pallbearer
- ILoveMakonnen
- Charles Bradley and his Extraordinaires
- Benjamin Booker
- Riverboat Gamblers
- Yung Lean & Sad Boys
- The Bright Light Social Hour
- Moon Taxi
- The Mountain Goats
- Diarrhea Planet
- Houndmouth
- The Band of Heathens
- Grizfolk
- Iceage
- Pentagram
- Ben Kweller
- Freeman
- Sarah Jaffe
- The Suffers
- Tunji Ige
- Buxton
- Robert Ellis
- Futurebirds
- Twin Peaks
- Goatwhore
- Con Brio
- Slaptop
- The Tontons
- Dpat
- Scale The Summit
- Hiram
- thelastplaceyoulook
- DJ Fredster
- Gio Chamba
- Boan
- Pope
- Night Drive
- We Were Wolves
- The Vanity
- Deep Cuts
- George West
- Guilla
- Kult Dizney
- Moji
- Catch Fever
- Second Lovers
- Prismo

=== 2016 ===
The event was held June 4–5, 2016 at NRG Park, Yellow Lot, Houston, TX

The lineup was:

- Collegrove (Lil Wayne & 2 Chaniz)
- Modest Mouse
- Zeds Dead
- Father John Misty (Canceled)
- Jamie XX
- Gogol Bordello
- Matt And Kim
- Logic
- A$AP Ferg
- X Ambassadors
- Tory Lanez
- Refused
- Frank Turner & The Sleeping Souls
- The Black Angels
- Built To Spill White
- White Denim
- Tiger Army
- Thee Oh Sees
- Zola Jesus
- The Heavy
- Anderson East
- David Ramirez
- Lewis Del Mar
- Chicano Batman
- The Coathangers
- Walker Lukens & The Side Arms
- Sir The Baptist
- Beatking
- Oxymorrons
- Child of Pop
- Plague Vendor
- King Finn
- Get a Life
- Deadmau5
- The National
- Edward Sharpe and the Magnetic Zeros
- The Chainsmokers
- Leon Bridges
- Young The Giant
- Big Gigantic
- Big Grams (Big Boi + Phantogram)
- Mac Miller
- Violent Femmes
- Mac Demarco
- 3Lau
- Borns
- Trampled by Turtles
- Allen Stone
- Against Me!
- Yung Lean
- Lolawolf
- Preservation Hall Jazz Band
- Wild Child
- Trae Tha Truth
- San Fermim
- Louis The Child
- Matthew Logan Vasquez
- Moving Units
- Blue Healer
- Aubrie Sellers
- Los Coast
- Private Excitement
- Ill Faded
- Another Run
- Nathan Quick

=== 2017 ===
The event was held June 3–4, 2017 at Eleanor Tinsley Park, Houston, TX.

Due to flash flood warnings, the remainder of the festival was cancelled.

The lineup was:

- Post Malone
- Lorde
- Flume
- G-Eazy
- Cage the Elephant
- Solange
- Jon Bellion
- Jauz
- Grouplove
- Miike Snow
- Milky Chance
- DVBBS
- Portugal. The Man
- St. Paul & the Broken Bones
- Rufus du Sol
- Big K.R.I.T
- Charli XCX
- The Strumbellas
- Cashmere Cat
- Jai Wolf
- Bishop Briggs
- The Struts
- Frightened Rabbit
- Amine
- Cheat Codes
- Party Favor
- Anna Lunoe
- Trill Sammy
- Bad Suns
- Vanic
- Stick Figure
- Hurray for the Riff Raff
- Hippo Campus
- Khruangbin
- Grits & Biscuits
- Cherry Glazerr
- K.I.D
- Echos
- Dreamers
- Coast Modern
- Mod Sun
- Rose Ette
- Night Drive
- -US
- Bang Bangz
- Camera Cult
- The Wheel Workers
- Deep Cuts
- Kay Weathers
- Miears
- Black Swan Yoga
- Dj Fredster
- Hiram

== Sponsors ==
As of 2013, the festival was supported by Absolut Vodka, Aio Wireless, American Apparel, Barefoot Refresh Wines, Budweiser, Cracker Jack'D, Chipotle Mexican Grill, Honest Tea, Houston Chronicle 29-95, ikan, IKEA, MKT Bar, Kroger, Lowe's, Red Bull, Seidio and the Texas Lottery.

As of 2017, the festival was supported by Budweiser, Brisk, Taco Bell, Dark Horse, DSW, Razor, TopGolf, Academy Sports + Outdoors, Jack Daniel's, Vita Coco and 11 Hundred.
