= Westheimer Street Festival =

Community street fair held bi-annually in Houston, Texas, US

The Westheimer Street Festival was a community street fair held bi-annually in Houston, Texas, United States from approximately 1971 to 2004. The festival underwent name and management changes afterwards. By 2009 the street festival was absorbed into what is currently now known as the Free Press Summer Fest.

== Community context ==
The festival (as well as its current successor, The Westheimer Block Party) takes its name from Westheimer Road, a thoroughfare in Houston which extends from approximately Bagby Street to the Westpark Tollway. At its near terminus, Westheimer Road passes for a number of blocks through Neartown. This area has acquired a reputation as Houston's 'bohemian' enclave sometime between the end of World War II and the 1960s. By the time of the Street Festival's inception, the Neartown area served as the social and geographic hub of Houston's Gay and Lesbian Community, as well as the focal point of alternative art and music within the City of Houston at large.

== Origin and early history ==
What became the Westheimer Street Festival was an offshoot of the Westheimer Colony Art Festival (known as the Bayou City Art Festival since 1997), which was established in 1971 as an arts/crafts festival. Both the original event and the later street fair occurred twice yearly over the course of a weekend in mid-April and a weekend in mid-October. Throughout the 1970s and 1980s, the 'Westheimer Art Festival' and the 'Westheimer Street Festival' continued to diverge. At one point, the art festival became a fenced-off, paid-admission event held in the parking lot of a strip center at the intersection of Westheimer Road and Montrose Boulevard. By this time, the Street Festival extended a dozen blocks along Westheimer and included well over a hundred art and craft vendors, food vendors and beer booths, as well as several outdoor stages showcasing local bands and musicians. Eventually, the Westheimer Colony Association decided to vacate the Neartown area altogether, first moving to downtown Houston and later Memorial Park—reorganizing in the process as the Bayou City Art Festival.

By the early 1990s, the Westheimer Street Festival had grown to an event that hosted as many as 300,000 attendees over a two-day period, requiring street closure on Westheimer for about half a dozen blocks and resulting in traffic jams for several blocks further in both directions. The festival had originally been a fairly anarchistic and organic event, with no central organization. Realizing that an event of this size required professional management, the City of Houston took steps to ensure that there would be no Westheimer Street Festival in the absence of professional management. The principal step was an agreement with the Texas Alcoholic Beverage Commission to prevent the issuance of so-called 'picnic permits' within the blocks covered by the festival. The TABC agreed that they would only issue a single alcohol permit to the individual or entity holding a street closure permit from the city. The city then restricted the conditions for obtaining the permit: it would not be issued unless the applicant had taken out an insurance policy covering the event and hired sufficient clean-up, sanitation, and security to guarantee minimal impact on surrounding residences. Under these circumstances, the Westheimer Street Festival came under the control of The Westheimer Street Festival Corporation, as led by John Florez.

== Recent history and controversy ==
Frictions between the street fair and local residents were only somewhat abated by Mr. Florez's management. He had no prior experience as an event producer and a tendency to minimize the event budget wherever possible. A frequent complaint from neighborhood homeowners was a chronic lack of portable toilets (and the attendant consequences), with minimal attention to post-event clean-up running a close second. What had started out as a friendly neighborhood event held by and for residents of a relaxed and fairly bohemian community had become a bacchanal crowding of thousands into a neighborhood increasingly dominated by upscale condominiums and their increasingly conservative inhabitants.

By the late 1990s, matters had reached the point where city council members Annise Parker and Chris Bell felt obliged to introduce a city ordinance requiring public hearings as a precondition for the issuance of a street closure permit. The ordinance became law on June 16, 1999. The last 'true' WestFest in Neartown was held on October 16 and 17, 1999. Shortly thereafter, Mr. Florez moved his event out of Neartown altogether, and for several years produced an event called "The Westheimer Street Festival in Exile" in Eleanor Tinsley Park several miles north of the original festival site. At this point, the last vestige of any similarity to the original community event was pretty well gone. Other parties beckoned however, and by 2002 the "Westheimer Street Festival in Exile" had largely run out of steam.

In 2003, Mr. Florez attempted to return his event to Neartown by unofficially piggybacking it onto the Annual Gay Pride Parade. The principal effect of this attempt was to alienate many of Mr. Florez's remaining friends in the Houston Gay and Lesbian Community and further cement opposition of local community groups to the entire idea of a neighborhood street party. Florez relocated to San Antonio in late 2004; he was murdered on June 23, 2007, by two young men at his local video store, Videos Mexicanos, who wanted to travel to Houston for the annual Gay Pride Weekend festivities.

== Rebirth as The Westheimer Block Party ==
October 15, 2005 saw the return, of sorts, of the Westheimer Street Festival. Initially called 'WestFest Compressed' and now known as 'The Westheimer Block Party', this event is the brainchild of Free Press Houston publisher Omar Afra. While it bears extremely little resemblance to the oversized and unmanageable street festival of the 1980s and 1990s, it bears considerable similarity to the community street festival and art show as it existed in the 1970s and early 1980s. The event occurs without street closure on series of properties around the intersection of Westheimer road and Taft Street. Changes the Neartown area has experienced over the last twenty years rule out the possibility that the 'Block Party' will ever grow to match the original festival. It has experienced a slow and steady growth over the last two years, however, and seems to be finding friends and supporters within the community. Afra later invested in a Westheimer Block Party replacement, the Free Press Summer Fest since 2009 where it is likely that a new reincarnation of the Westheimer Street Festival is done for good.
