= The Monarch Community =

Controversial American residential facility in Texas

- Founder: Grover Shaunty
- Headquarters: Houston, Texas
- Location: Fulshear, Texas
- Website: https://themonarchcommunity.org/
- Formerly called: Shaunty Healing; The Mental Health Co-Op

The Monarch Community (formerly known as Shaunty Healing and The Mental Health Co-Op) is an active residential facility advertising for outpatient psychiatric treatment. It's been closed in the past, only to repoen on the same properties, and has had multiple reports against it, including bad reviews on its business profiles and criticism by the press.

== History ==
The facility was founded by Grover Shaunty and its main address is located in the Montrose neighborhood of Houston, Texas. Its earliest known name is The Mental Health Co-Op, before rebranding as Shaunty Healing and then its current name The Monarch Community. It was temporarily closed due to licensing infractions, but the properties were remodeled and the staff returned to the locations they worked at.

The Monarch Community advertises housing for patients with severe mental illness and compound substance addictions in their properties in Houston. Shaunty would also house residents at his private property in Fulshear, where the facility advertises therapy with the farm animals there. Shaunty is no longer listed as the director of the Monarch Community.

== Founder ==
Grover Shaunty has been reported to have licensing as a social worker, and has been interviewed by Texas Monthly regarding the AIDS epidemic in the United States. He was last reported to live on a farm in Fulshear, where multiple farm animals and international animals live and are under Shaunty's ownership, as well as have been attended to by hired staff and the residents of the Monarch Community. One of them, Karl the Rhea, briefy escaped from the farm's fencing and was later returned.

== Controversies and Criticism ==
According to an article published by Free Press Houston, the facility has had a history legal reports regarding the residents at the facility, including physical assaults, a sexual assault, and at least one death. The nearby residents also filed their own reports and complaints to the police. Shaunty himself has had a history of refused or poor returns of loans from affiliates and failures to appear in court for civil suits. The article also described lawsuits by the State of Texas, revealing Shaunty was operating residential facilities for years without proper licensing. The article challenged Shaunty's reports on his career history by citing multiple news articles providing different accounts of his activities and consultation. Shaunty described himself in different reports as a social worker and psychotherapist, as well as operating a food service, and he's provided changing accounts on whether or not his facilities offer boarding alone or also provide treatment.

An anonymous review on Yelp, when the business was named Shaunty Healing, has specifically reported deaths on the facility, isolating patients from outside contact and charging them for the time they're there, using them for unpaid labor to maintain the properties, and constructing a holding cell on one property using iron doors operated by keys and bars on the windows. The business descriptor is listed as "Psychologists".
