= Rip It Out =

EP by thelastplaceyoulook
- Released: December 20, 2013 (U.S.)
- Recorded: August–December, 2013
- Genre: Alternative rock Hard rock Post-grunge; Post-emo
- Length: 22:12
- Label: Independent
- Producer: thelastplaceyoulook, Matt Novesky

Thelastplaceyoulook chronology
See the Light Inside You (2009)	Rip It Out (2013)

Singles from Rip It Out
- 1. "Rip It Out"

Rip It Out, is an extended play album by American rock band thelastplaceyoulook. It was released on December 30, 2013 and produced by thelastplaceyoulook and Matt Novesky. The first single is "Rip it Out," and also features a rock cover of Miley Cyrus' Wrecking Ball.

== Track listing ==
All songs written by thelastplaceyoulook

1. "Rip It Out" - 3:35
2. "Sexytime" - 3:30
3. "Awake" - 3:46
4. "Quagmire" - 3:29
5. "Ebb And Flow" - 4:00
6. "Wrecking Ball" (cover) - 3:47

== Personnel ==
=== Band ===
- Justin Nava – vocals
- Kevin Pool – bass, vocals
- Derek Young – guitar
- Richard Sherwood – guitar
- Mikey Garcia – drums
- Andy Moths – drums (former member)

=== Production ===
- thelastplaceyoulook – producers
- Matt Novesky – producer
- Paul Logus – mixing, mastering
- Kevin Butler – engineering, mixing
