= Buzzfest =

Name of two unrelated American music festivals

- Genre: Houston: Alternative rock, grunge, pop punk, post-grunge, punk rock, rap rock, rock Nashville: Alternative rock, grunge, pop punk, post-grunge, punk rock, rock, metal, hard rock,
- Locations: Nashville, Tennessee, U.S. Houston, Texas, U.S.
- Years active: Houston: 1995–present Nashville: 2010

Buzzfest is the name of two unrelated music festivals held in Houston, Texas and Nashville, Tennessee, United States. The Buzzfest in Houston is a bi-annual show hosted by the radio station 94.5 The Buzz while the Buzzfest in Nashville is an annual show (usually in the late summer) hosted by the radio station 102.9 The Buzz.

== Buzzfest in Nashville ==
=== Past events ===
- Buzzfest 2010 September 10, 2010
  LP Field
  Shinedown, Seether, Papa Roach, Sick Puppies, Janus (Cancelled), November, Manic Bloom, Adalene, Forgotten Fable, Voodoo Prophet
  Voodoo Prophet was officially the first metal band to ever play LP Field being the opening band for Buzzfest 2010. Following Voodoo Prophet, another Nashville-based metal band named Forgotten Fable took the stage at 2010 Buzzfest shortly after the band was awarded a NIMA (Nashville Independent Music Awards) for "2010 Best Hard Rock Band", which is a prestigious award in Music City.

== Buzzfest in Houston ==
=== Past events ===
- Buzzfest I June 4, 1995
  Cynthia Woods Mitchell Pavilion
  Bush, Face to Face, Our Lady Peace, Maids of Gravity, Matthew Sweet, Modern English, Ned's Atomic Dustbin, The Nixons, No Use for a Name, Phunk Junkeez, POL
- Buzzfest II April 20, 1996
  Cynthia Woods Mitchell Pavilion
  Gravity Kills, 22 Brides, Atticus Finch, God Lives Under Water, The Hunger, Lush, Modern English, The Nixons, Poe, Toadies, Too Much Joy
- Buzzfest III August 30, 1997
  Cynthia Woods Mitchell Pavilion
  Abra Moore, Artificial Joy Club, Buck O' Nine, Cowboy Mouth, Matchbox Twenty, Old 97's, Seven Mary Three, Silverchair
- Buzzfest IV April 25, 1998
  Cynthia Woods Mitchell Pavilion
  Athenaeum, Big Wreck, Black Lab, Bluebird, Cool 4 August, Creed, Face Plan, Foo Fighters, Mighty Joe Plumb, Our Lady Peace, RiverFenix, Los Skarnales, Spacehog, The Hunger, Train in Vain
- Buzzfest V April 25, 1999
  Cynthia Woods Mitchell Pavilion
  Better Than Ezra, Chlorine, Collective Soul, Eve 6, The Flys, GPR, Jude, Lit, My Friend Steve, Soul Coughing, Sponge, Tin Star, Tommy Henrickson, Train
- Buzzfest VI April 15, 2000
  Cynthia Woods Mitchell Pavilion
  The Flys, Frankie Machine, Joe 90, Lit, Mars Electric, Oleander, Owsley, Papa Roach, Peter Searcy, Radford, Stir, Stroke 9, Third Eye Blind, Tonic
- Buzzfest VII April 22, 2001
  Cynthia Woods Mitchell Pavilion
  Color, Dexter Freebish, Dust for Life, Electrasy, Eve 6, Linkin Park, Lucky Boys Confusion, The Offspring, Oleander, Orgy, Spacehog, Train
- Buzzfest VIII November 17, 2001
  Cynthia Woods Mitchell Pavilion
  8stops7, Alien Ant Farm, The Apex Theory, Bliss 66, The Calling, Default, Fuel, Joydrop, Nickelback, Pressure 4-5, Remy Zero, Saliva, Tantric, Transmatic
- Buzzfest IX April 21, 2002
  Cynthia Woods Mitchell Pavilion
  Thirty Seconds to Mars, Abandoned Pools, Adema, Course of Nature, Drowning Pool, Earshot, Gravity Kills, Mest, P.O.D., Pressure 4-5, Puddle of Mudd, Sum 41, Trik Turner, Unwritten Law
- Buzzfest X October 27, 2002
  Cynthia Woods Mitchell Pavilion
  Audiovent, Box Car Racer, Earshot, Everclear, The Exies, Filter (did not play), Greenwheel, H_{2}O, Home Town Hero, Hoobastank, OK Go, Saliva, Seether, Sugarcult, The Used
- Buzzfest XI May 10, 2003
  Cynthia Woods Mitchell Pavilion
  The All-American Rejects, Breaking Benjamin, Evanescence, The Exies, Godsmack, Maroon 5, Off by One, Powerman 5000, RA, Seether, Skrape, Systematic, Stone Sour, Taproot, Trapt, The Used
- Buzzfest XII October 11, 2003
  Cynthia Woods Mitchell Pavilion
  Alien Ant Farm, The Ataris, Billy Talent, Eve 6, Fountains of Wayne, Fuel, Staind, Static-X, Smile Empty Soul, Socialburn, Switchfoot, Three Days Grace, Trapt, Vendetta Red, Yellowcard
- Buzzfest XIII April 17, 2004
  Cynthia Woods Mitchell Pavilion
  Cold, Drowning Pool, Everlast, Finger Eleven, Hoobastank, Ima Robot, Lo-Pro, Lostprophets, Marcy Playground, Puddle of Mudd, Sevendust, Smile Empty Soul, Strata, Three Days Grace, Thornley, Thrice, Trapt
- Buzzfest XIV October 30, 2004
  Cynthia Woods Mitchell Pavilion
  Authority Zero, Breaking Benjamin, Burden Brothers, Chevelle, Earshot, The Exies, My Chemical Romance, Papa Roach, Riddlin Kids, Seether, Shinedown, Skindred, Story of the Year, The Vanished, Velvet Revolver
- Buzzfest XV April 23, 2005
  Cynthia Woods Mitchell Pavilion
  3 Doors Down, Alter Bridge, Breaking Benjamin, The Exies, Glass Intrepid, Mudvayne, No Address, Papa Roach, Snow Patrol, Sum 41, Theory of a Deadman, Trust Company, Unwritten Law, The Used, Wakefield
- Buzzfest XVI October 22, 2005
  Cynthia Woods Mitchell Pavilion (originally scheduled to take place at Minute Maid Park but moved due to the Houston Astros reaching the World Series)
  10 Years, Thirty Seconds to Mars, Audioslave, Bloodhound Gang, Boys Night Out, Coheed and Cambria, Cold, Dredg, Fall Out Boy, Hinder, Institute, Motion City Soundtrack, Nickelback, Our Lady Peace, Panic! at the Disco, Seether, The Starting Line, Vaux, Yellowcard
- Buzzfest XVII June 17, 2006
  Cynthia Woods Mitchell Pavilion
  10 Years, Blue October, Buckcherry, Brill and Hurt, Candlebox, Evans Blue, Hinder, Hoobastank, Huck Johns, Hurt, People in Planes, Shinedown, Staind, Three Days Grace, Trapt
- Buzzfest XVIII October 8, 2006
  Cynthia Woods Mitchell Pavilion
  Alice in Chains, Avenged Sevenfold, Boys Like Girls, Breaking Benjamin, Crossfade, Eighteen Visions, Evans Blue, Everclear, Hurt, Lostprophets, OK Go, Panic Channel, The Red Jumpsuit Apparatus, Stone Sour
- Buzzfest XIX April 21, 2007
  Cynthia Woods Mitchell Pavilion
  Autovein, Blue October, Buckcherry, Chevelle, The Exies, Finger Eleven, Hinder, Jet, Papa Roach, Puddle of Mudd, The Red Jumpsuit Apparatus, Saosin, Seether, Smile Empty Soul, Three Days Grace, The Vanished
  The show sold-out within two hours.
- Buzzfest XX October 28, 2007
  Cynthia Woods Mitchell Pavilion
  Alter Bridge, Another Animal, The Bravery, Chris Cornell, Earshot, Evanescence, Evans Blue, Fair to Midland, Finger Eleven, Fuel, Glass Intrepid, Sick Puppies, The Smashing Pumpkins, The Starting Line, Sum 41
- Buzzfest XXI April 26, 2008
  Cynthia Woods Mitchell Pavilion
  3 Doors Down, 10 Years, Atreyu, Billy Talent, Chevelle, Filter, Finger Eleven, My Chemical Romance, Puddle of Mudd, Red, Seether, Sick Puppies, Story of the Year, Theory of a Deadman
- Buzzfest XXII May 10, 2009
  Cynthia Woods Mitchell Pavilion
  Buzzfest XXII was originally scheduled for October 26, 2008 at the Cynthia Woods Mitchell Pavilion but extensive damage from Hurricane Ike forced its cancellation. The event was subsequently rescheduled for the same day at the Verizon Wireless Theater as The Buzz 94.5's First Annual Better Than Nothing Show. Appearing from the original Buzzfest XXII lineup were: 10 Years, Earshot, Hawthorne Heights, Merriwether, The Offspring, and Saving Abel. (The cancelled lineup from the Woodlands was 10 Years, Drive A, Earshot, Hawthorne Heights, Ludo, Merriwether, The Offspring, Papa Roach, Puddle of Mudd, Saving Abel, Seether, Staind, and The Toadies.)

Due to the cancellation of the Fall 2008 show, the Spring 2009 show was called Buzzfest XXII (instead of Buzzfest XXIII). It was scheduled for Sunday May 10, 2009 at the Cynthia Woods Mitchell Pavilion. A line-up and announcement party was scheduled for Thursday March 12, 2009 during a live broadcast with Dan Jantzen from 3 pm to 7 pm at House of Blues in Downtown Houston.

The line-up was Korn, Shinedown, 311, The Red Jumpsuit Apperatus, Papa Roach, 10 Years, Blue October, Hoobastank, Theory of a Deadman, Anberlin, The Toadies, Framing Hanley, Electric touch, Aranda

- Buzzfest XXIII October 24, 2009
  Cynthia Woods Mitchell Pavilion
  Appearing were Alice in Chains, Puddle of Mudd, Chevelle, Jet, Our Lady Peace, Saving Abel, The Veer Union, Billy Boy on Poison, Janus, Tantric, Framing Hanley, and Earshot
- Buzzfest XXIV May 2, 2010
  Cynthia Woods Mitchell Pavilion
  Main Stage: Limp Bizkit, Three Days Grace, Thirty Seconds to Mars, Seether, Deftones, Switchfoot, Metric.
  Side Stage: Flyleaf, Sick Puppies, Cage the Elephant, 10 Years, Violent Soho, Crash Kings, Anchored.
  The show sold-out within 15 minutes.
- Buzzfest XXV October 23, 2010
  Cynthia Woods Mitchell Pavilion
  Appearing were Godsmack, Bush, Seether, Papa Roach, Finger Eleven, Filter, Anberlin, Sick Puppies, The Dirty Heads, Saving Abel, Paper Tongues, Neon Trees, New Politics and Civil Twilight.
- Buzzfest XXVI Sunday, May 1, 2011
  Cynthia Woods Mitchell Pavilion
  Main Stage: Jane's Addiction, Social Distortion, Seether, Puddle of Mudd, Flogging Molly, The Airborne Toxic Event, New Politics.
  Side Stage: The Dirty Heads, Evans Blue, Red Jumpsuit Apparatus, Middle Class Rut, My Darkest Days, Young the Giant, Electric Touch.
- Buzzfest XXVII Saturday, October 22, 2011
  Cynthia Woods Mitchell Pavilion
  Main Stage: thelastplaceyoulook, Filter, Evans Blue, Everlast, Chevelle, Staind, Bush.
  Side Stage: Kyng, Anberlin, Switchfoot, Sleeper Agent, Awolnation (Cancelled), P.O.D., 10 Years.
- Buzzfest XXVIII Saturday, April 21, 2012
  Cynthia Woods Mitchell Pavilion
  Main Stage: The Features, Foxy Shazam, Mutemath, Cage the Elephant, Blue October, Evanescence, Korn.
  Side Stage: Aranda, Hurt, Dead Sara, Band of Skulls, Neon Trees, Dirty Heads, Evans Blue.
- Buzzfest XXIX Saturday, October 6, 2012
  Cynthia Woods Mitchell Pavilion
  Main Stage: thelastplaceyoulook, Hanni El Khatib, Tremonti, Dead Sara, 10 Years, The Toadies, Three Days Grace.
  Side Stage: The Stone Foxes, Atlas Genius, Red Jumpsuit Apparatus, Saving Abel, Lit, Hollywood Undead, Silversun Pickups.
- Buzzfest XXX Saturday, April 20, 2013
  Cynthia Woods Mitchell Pavilion
  Main Stage: A Silent Film, Beware of Darkness, Sick Puppies, Papa Roach, Stone Sour, Bush, Shinedown.
  Side Stage: The Virginmarys, I Am Dynamite, Youngblood Hawke, Oleander, The Dirty Heads, Hollywood Undead, P.O.D.
- Buzzfest XXXI Saturday, November 2, 2013
  Cynthia Woods Mitchell Pavilion
  Main Stage: The Virginmarys, I Am Dynamite, New Politics, The Dirty Heads, Blue October, Chevelle, Stone Temple Pilots.
  Side Stage: Nico Vega, Middle Class Rut, The Mowgli's, Oleander, 10 Years, Cage the Elephant.
- Buzzfest XXXII Saturday, October 18, 2014
  Cynthia Woods Mitchell Pavilion
  Main Stage: Milky Chance, Big Data, Switchfoot, Young the Giant, Cage the Elephant, Papa Roach, Chevelle.
  Side Stage: New Medicine, Bad Suns, Bear Hands, New Politics, Evans Blue, The Dirty Heads, P.O.D.
- Buzzfest XXXIII Saturday, April 18, 2015
  Cynthia Woods Mitchell Pavilion
  Main Stage: Godsmack, Breaking Benjamin, AWOLNATION, Buckcherry, Joywave, Young Guns, Not In The Face.
  Side Stage: The Dirty Heads, Hollywood Undead, New Politics, Robert DeLong, Art Alexakis, I Am Dynamite, Within Reason.
- Buzzfest XXXIV Saturday, October 17, 2015
  Cynthia Woods Mitchell Pavilion
  Main Stage: Papa Roach, Our Lady Peace, P.O.D., Panic! At The Disco, Big Wreck, The Struts, Wolf Alice.
  Side Stage: Bring Me the Horizon, Yelawolf, Pop Evil, Candlebox, Atlas Genius, Issues, PVRIS.
- Buzzfest XXXV Saturday, April 16, 2016
  Cynthia Woods Mitchell Pavilion
  Main Stage: Cage the Elephant, The Offspring, Blue October, AWOLNATION, Toadies.
  Side Stage: Everclear, Joy Formidable, Nothing But Thieves, Andrew Watt, Fitz and the Tantrums, The Struts, Big Data, New Beat Fund.
- Buzzfest XXXVI Saturday, April 15, 2017
  Cynthia Woods Mitchell Pavilion
  Main Stage: Godsmack, Breaking Benjamin, Toadies, Filter, Red Sun Rising, Missio, Badflower.
  Side Stage: P.O.D., New Politics, Highly Suspect, PVRIS, The Unlikely Candidates, Dreamers, Bleeker.
- Buzzfest XXXVII Saturday, October 27, 2018
  Cynthia Woods Mitchell Pavilion
  Main Stage: A Perfect Circle, Chevelle, Scott Stapp, The Struts, Badflower, Grandson, Bear Hands.
  Side Stage: Dirty Heads, Mike Shinoda, Puddle of Mudd, The Nixons, The Blue Stones, Hold On Hollywood, Jacob Kulick
