= MNYNMS =

Live electronic music band

- Origin: Houston, TX
- Genres: House; Synthpop; Chillwave; Nu-Disco
- Instruments: Keyboard; DAW; Drum Kit
- Years active: 2014 – present
- Members: Jake Childs; Jessica Wahlquist; Lacey Youngblood
- Website: mnynms.com

MNYNMS (pronounced "Many Names") is a live electronic music trio from Houston, Texas made up of members Jake Childs (Production and live drums), Jessica Wahlquist (Production, vocals and Keys) and Lacey Youngblood (Live Keyboard).

== Music ==
Their first EP, Projection Series was released on the label Detroit Underground to iTunes in 2015 and received positive reviews. Their second EP Rite of Passage was released to iTunes in 2016. They have worked on projects with other electronic music acts such as Teeel, The New Division, FM Attack, Faded Away as well as various unofficial remixes.

== Festivals and Performances ==
In 2015, MNYNMS performed alongside electronic music group Teeel at the renowned Knitting Factory in Brooklyn, NY. In addition to local performances in their native city of Houston, Texas, they have performed at large EDM festivals such as Whatever Festival and Day for night Festival.

== Acclaim ==
In 2016 they were nominated for an award in the Houston Press Music Awards. A recent article in Nylon Magazine credits the group for "refreshing the electronic music scene in Houston".

== Discography ==
=== EP's ===
- 2015 - Projection Series EP
- 2016 - Rite of Passage EP
- 2016 - Rite of Passage Remix EP

=== Releases ===
- 2016 - Oracle

=== Remixes ===
- 2015 - Teeel - Imperial (MNYNMS Remix)
- 2015 - Night Drive - Easy To Lie (MNYNMS Remake)
- 2015 - Thomas Roberts - Secret Garden (MNYNMS Remake)
- 2015 - Crystal Castles - Not in Love (MNYNMS Remake)
- 2015 - Purity Ring - Belispeak (MNYNMS Remake)
- 2015 - The New Division - Introspective (MNYNMS Remix)
- 2016 - Empathy Test - Seeing Stars (MNYNMS Remix)

=== Collaborations ===
- 2017 - Frozen and Inner Space (feat. MNYNMS) by FM Attack
- 2018 - Nite Bites (feat. MNYNMS) by Faded Away
