= Lower Westheimer, Houston =

Area in Houston, Texas

Townhouses on Lovett Blvd

Lower Westheimer is an area in Houston, Texas, United States. It is centered on Westheimer Road, and is considered to be East of Shepherd, and West of Midtown. Several historic neighborhoods are partially or completely located within the area including Montrose and Hyde Park. Lower Wertheimer is known for its hipster culture, nightlife, arts, and food scene.

== Location ==
While there are no formal borders of Lower Westheimer, the East-West borders are respectively known to be Shepherd Dr to the west, and Bagby St to the east. This is also where Westheimer turns into Elgin St, as well as Midtown Houston. The southern border is usually considered Interstate 69, and the northern borders are thought to be Gray St. This puts Lower Westheimer entirely within the Montrose Management District (not to be confused with the neighborhood of Montrose).

== Culture ==
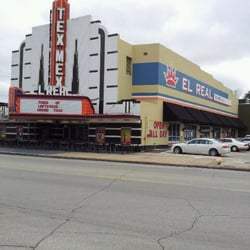
El Real Tex Mex is a prominent landmark in Lower Westheimer

Lower Wertheimer is considered the center of Houston’s hipster community. Street art plays a big role, and can be found throughout the area. In 2012, Forbes named Lower Westheimer as one of “America's Hippest Hipster Neighborhoods”.

=== Food scene ===
A food truck in Lower Westheimer

Lower Westheimer is known for its diverse food scene ranging from Tex-Mex, Puerto Rican, Kolaches, Greek, burger joints, Sichuan, sushi, Lebanese, Vietnamese, and Thai. Food trucks also have a large presence in the area. El Real Tex Mex restaurants is considered a landmark, and is well-known both for its food and its architecture. One of the most popular restaurants, Underbelly, is known for bringing Houston's ethnic diversity together in its food. Among other popular restaurants in the area include Tex Chick, Gusto Gourmet, Mala Sichuan, UB Preserve, Rosie Cannonball, Niko Niko's, Les Noo'dle, Empire Cafe, Uchi, Hugo's, Ramen Tatsuya and more.

=== Art ===
==== Visial arts ====
Street Art in Lower Westheimer

Art businesses have been present in the area dating as far back as the 1970s. Lower Westheimer was also the location of the Westheimer Street Festival, which eventually absorbed into the Free Press Summer Festival. Since the 70s, the community has grown, and currently, one can find art galleries across the neighborhood. Famed art collectors John de Menil and Dominique de Menil opened the Menil Collection is located within the area, and it now operates as a museum.

==== Music ====
Throughout its history, Lower Westheimer has been a major area for live music. Many of the bars and restaurant feature live musical performances. Beyoncé and Destiny's Child performed in the area before their fame, where their usual stage was Headliners which has since left the neighborhood. Popular pop country singer Lyle Lovett also had his first performance in the Anderson Fair Retail Restaurant which is still in the area.

Other popular venues for in the area include Boondocks, Numbers, Rudyard's, and Brasil Cafe.

== Education ==
The Houston Independent School District operates all public schools.

Most of the area falls in the zone of Lamar High School.

== See also ==
- Montrose, Houston
