= Roky Moon and Bolt =

American glam rock band

Roky Moon and Bolt!
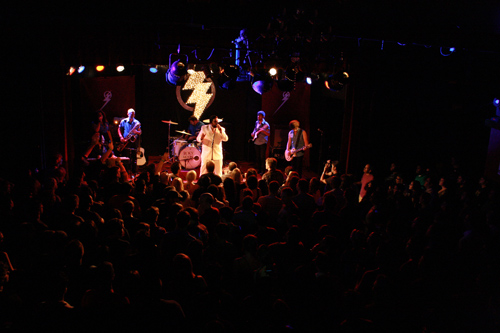
- Roky Moon and Bolt! performing in July 2011

Background information
- Origin: Austin/Houston, Texas, United States
- Genres: Glam rock, rock
- Years active: 2008–2012, 2014–present
- Labels: Zenhill Records, Homeskool Rekordz
- Members: Roky Moon; Aaron Echegaray; Jeoaf Johnson; Smokin’ Joe Cornetti; Arthur Moreno; Bustos; Jesse Smith; Jenny Carson; Rockyanne Bullwinkel
- Past members: Chad Pinter; Cassie Hargrove; Pete Tijerina; Jessica Janes; Rikki Conner
- Website: rokymoonandbolt.com

Roky Moon and Bolt! are an American glam rock band from Houston, Texas, United States. They formed in late 2008, not performing live until March 2009. The original lineup was a four-piece conceived by Mike Hardin; several additional musicians joined as the band's performances became increasingly frequent. They were soon to be found on a variety of major shows around Houston, including each successive Free Press Summer Fest, and noteworthy appearances with such artists as Daniel Johnston, Tokyo Police Club, Bun B, and Indian Jewelry.

== History ==
=== Formation and first album ===
The band began to play heavily around Houston throughout 2009. By December of that year, they had been cast as the backing band for a Catastrophic Theatre production based on the life of Daniel Johnston titled "Life is Happy and Sad." The Houston Press had also twice recognized the new band in both their annual Music Awards and Best Of editions.

The Spring of 2010 was the first east coast tour for the band, and they began recording immediately after. Roky Moon and Bolt! first appeared on an independently distributed compilation album, Summer Exposure, as well as the live compilation from KTRU Rice Radio, titled KTRU Live Vol 2. This all led to a self-titled album recorded at Digital Warehaus Studios over the course of the summer, to be released in November 2010 on Homeskool Rekordz.

It was during this period that the band appeared on Live From SugarHill Studios - Episode 18, which first caught the attention of Zenhill Records.

=== American Honey ===
Roky Moon and Bolt! signed with Zenhill Records soon after the first album's release. The second album was recorded at SugarHill Recording Studios on January 17, 2011. Producer/President Dan Workman spearheaded the recording, as well as conceptualized the 'One Day Record.' The album was recorded as planned, in four complete takes of the entire piece with Zenfilm crews adjusting cameras and resetting in between. American Honey was released on July 30, 2011, at Fitzgerald's; the first footage from the recording of the album surfaced on the same day.

=== Break up ===
The band planned to perform its final show at the 2012 Free Press Summer Fest, but cancelled. After re-uniting in 2014 for a trio of shows in Houston and Austin, the band has resumed activity and now plays regularly.

=== Other work ===
Material has been compiling throughout the life of the band to finish what is apparently a near-complete rock opera. Talks with Catastrophic Theatre were underway over producing the show in 2010, but a recording schedule and increasing performance conflicts delayed the project. The show, penned by Roky Moon and comic book artist Becky Cloonan is tentatively titled "The Man Who Couldn't Save The World," a sci-fi drama centering on a troubled figure named Avory, and was on track to be produced and performed in conjunction with the release of the accompanying soundtrack album in 2018.
