= The Sour Notes =

Rock band from Texas

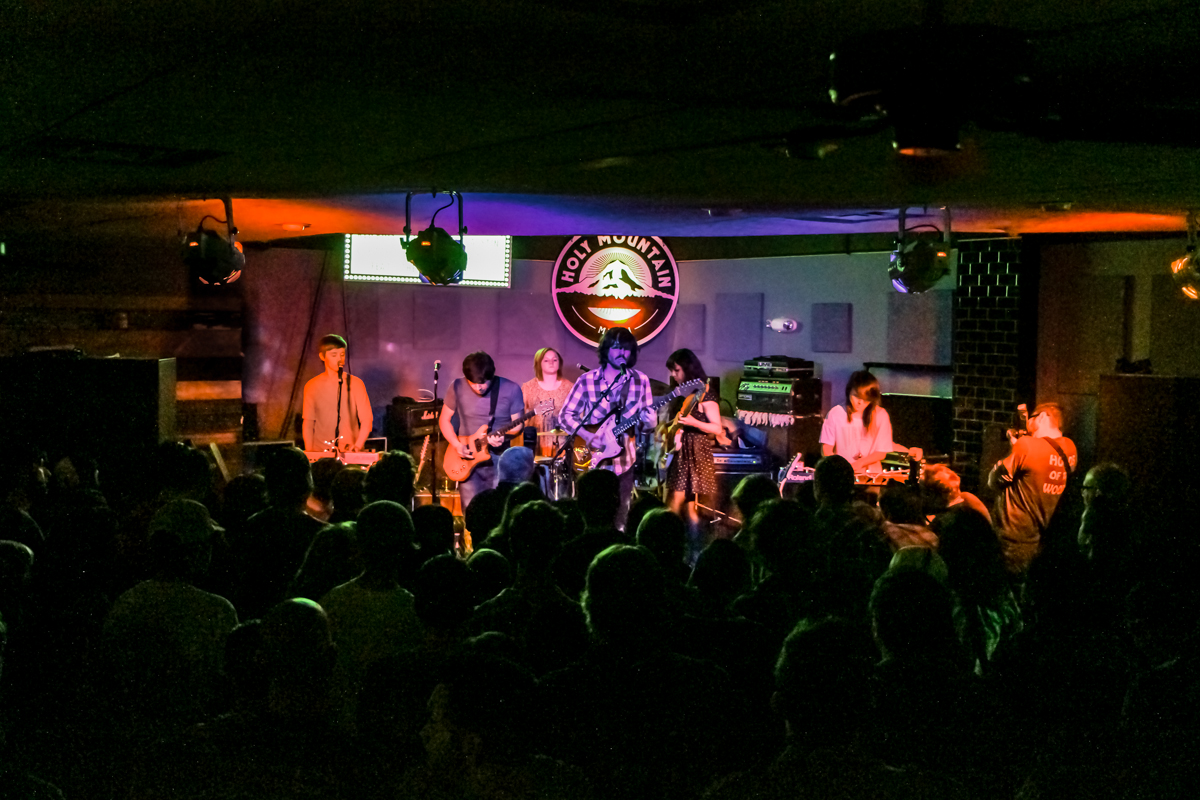
- The Sour Notes performing at Holy Mountain in Austin, Texas, February 2013

Background information
- Origin: Austin, Texas, United States
- Genres: Indie rock; dream pop
- Years active: 2008–present
- Members: Jared Boulanger; Amarah Boulanger; Jeremy Harrell
- Website: www.thesournotes.com

The Sour Notes are an American independent rock band from Austin, Texas, formed in 2008 by multi-instrumentalist Jared Boulanger—who writes and composes all of the band's material.

They are known for their cross-genre, DIY aesthetic, self-releasing a prolific catalog of music on vinyl, cassette and CD. The Sour Notes have toured nationally over ten times, making appearances at CMJ, SXSW, NXNE, Fun Fun Fun Fest, The UMS, Free Press Summer Fest and have shared stages with such diverse bands as The Dandy Warhols, Of Montreal, Foxygen, Future Islands, We Are Scientists, Albert Hammond Jr. and Daniel Johnston.

== History ==
=== Formation and The Meat of the Fruit EP ===
The Sour Notes began initially as the moniker for singer-songwriter Jared Boulanger’s home recordings, while living in a garage apartment in the Montrose-area of Houston, Texas. The name of the band stems from his collection of Moleskine journals containing drawings, rhyme schemes and notes on self improvement, which he called his "Sour Notes”. With the help of friend and engineer Steve Christensen, this material was turned into a 6-song EP entitled The Meat of the Fruit, which featured a variety of instruments played by Boulanger, accompanied by female guest vocals.

=== Received in Bitterness and Touring ===
Upon finishing The Meat of the Fruit, Boulanger relocated to Austin, Texas and moved-in with friend and keyboardist Chris Page with plans of forming a live band. There, they met drummer Travis Hackett and bassist Brandi Dipietro through mutual friends and began performing live as a four-piece with Boulanger and Page sometimes using up to five synthesizers on stage between them. After only a handful of shows together, the group quickly recorded debut album Received in Bitterness in the laundry room of their French Place home and hit the road on a 13-city winter tour up the East Coast in January 2009. Later that year, the band released 7-inch single Never Mix, Never Worry, which presents a more standard-rock format to The Sour Notes' characteristically evolving sound. Shortly after, bassist Brandi Dipietro left the band, causing The Sour Notes to incorporate live electronics and sequenced bass parts during shows.

=== It’s Not Gonna Be Pretty ===
The Sour Notes added keyboardist Elaine Greer to the band during the recording of their synth-heavy second album It's Not Gonna Be Pretty, which was released in January 2010 to much critical acclaim. Following an East Coast tour in support of the album, the band added bassist Amarah Ulghani and The Sour Notes were selected as official showcasing artists at the 2010 SXSW Music Festival, opening for We Are Scientists at the Official SXSWi Closing Party and Daniel Johnston that summer. The Sour Notes spent the remainder of the year touring with numerous additions to the band, playing over 60 shows in and around the U.S. that year, including Free Press Summer Fest in Houston and the CMJ Music Marathon in New York City.

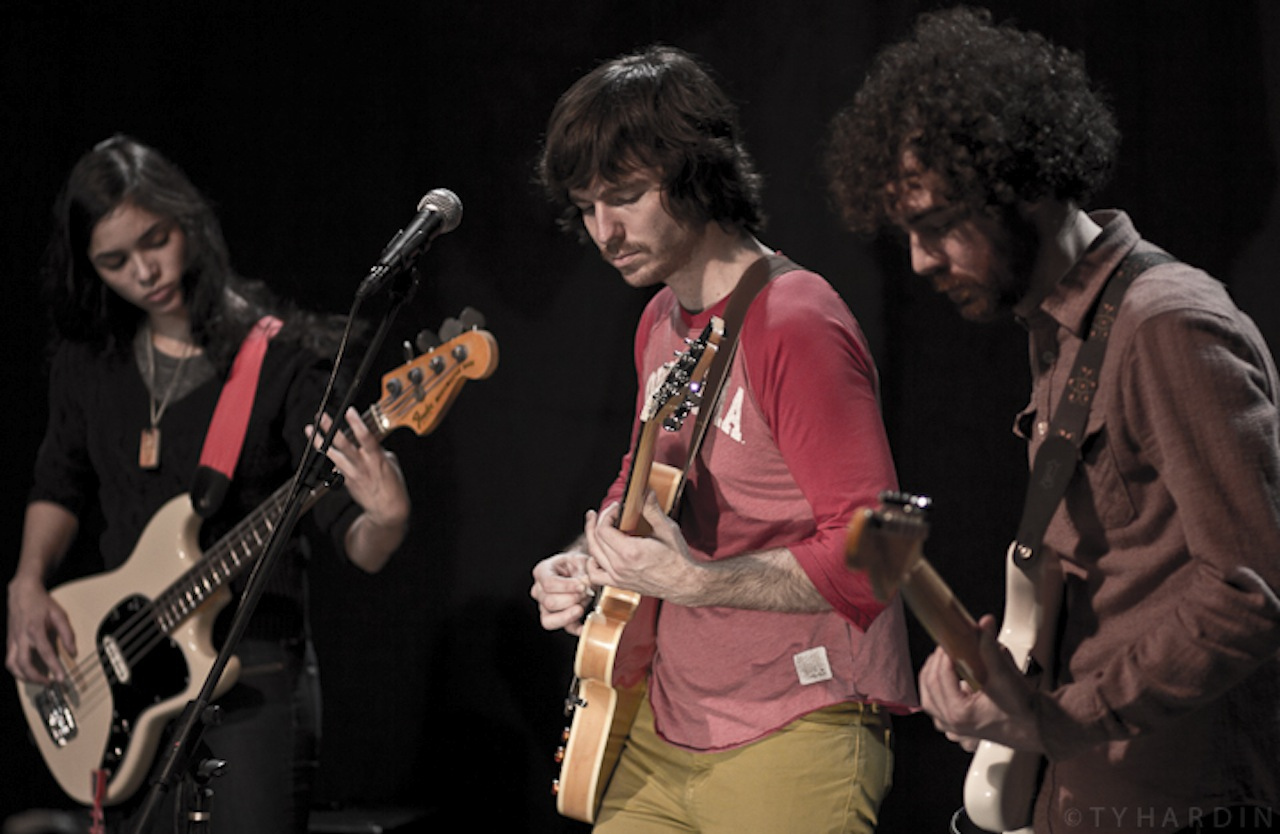
The Sour Notes performing live on air at KVRX 91.7 FM in Austin, Texas

=== Last Looks ===
At the turn of 2011, The Sour Notes released 7-inch single Hot Pink Flares ahead of third album Last Looks, featuring orchestral group Mother Falcon, who arranged string sections on the album and backed The Sour Notes at their release show at Mohawk in Austin. The album was recorded almost entirely without synthesizer and contains a dominant use of acoustic instruments and female vocals. The band toured the East Coast in support of the album and were invited to play the 35 Conferette in Denton and the 2011 NXNE Music Festival in Toronto.

In February 2012, the band released a split 7-inch record with fellow Austin band Marmalakes on the No Play Music label. The record featured the single "Two Hands Wait" off their forthcoming album Do What May, which The Sour Notes would spend the next two years recording. Later that year, U.S. television series Shameless featured The Sour Notes songs "Do-ers & Say-ers" and "One Fell Swoop" during its second season premiere on Showtime.

=== Do What May ===
Following the momentum of sequential releases and gaining a reputation for their prolific output, The Sour Notes were first-round picks at SXSW 2013 and released a cassette-compilation entitled In The Meanwhile, containing previously released, fan-favorited songs, plus the second single from their upcoming album Do What May and a cover of the Wire song "Mannequin". The Sour Notes spent that summer road-testing new songs and were selected to open for The Dandy Warhols at Stubb’s as a part of the Red Bull Sound Select program in Austin.

Upon wrapping recording on fourth album Do What May in 2014, the band embarked on a 10-city West Coast tour in support of the album, that took them to Seattle and back in just 10 days. The album was released that September at Cheer Up Charlies in Austin to glowing reviews and featured many local guest musicians, including Sabrina Ellis of A Giant Dog, who sang on the title track. A couple of months later, The Sour Notes released a Do What May Remix compilation featuring The Octopus Project and were invited to perform at Fun Fun Fun Fest in Austin, where they played an exclusive after-show with Foxygen at Red 7.

=== Darkest Sour and Finest Sour ===
In 2017, The Sour Notes premiered a music video for their song Ride It Out, which shadows the daily life of television actress Danielle Burgess. The video was directed by photographer Travis Emery Hackett and nominated for "Best Cinematography" at the 2017 AMVFest. Later that year, the band released their fifth album Darkest Sour at Hotel Vegas in Austin. In an interview about the album, guitarist Jared Boulanger said "I’ve hit a stride – from recording Darkest Sour – of productivity that I haven’t had since the beginning. I have some stuff in the can, ready to go and it’s kinda like – since I’ve been exploring guitar stuff more, listening to a lot more Dinosaur Jr., Built to Spill – I’ve changed the way I play. I’ve changed the amps I use, the pedals I use. I don’t know if you can tell, but the guitars on this album are much heavier." The album was mixed by Steve Christensen (Steve Earle, Khruangbin), mastered by Joe LaPorta (David Bowie, Parquet Courts) and praised by critics. The Sour Notes would later release two new tracks on 7-inch, recorded during those same studio sessions called Finest Sour.

=== This Is Not Our Music ===
In 2018, the band recorded a 10-track covers album entitled This Is Not Our Music. The album features covers of songs by Galaxie 500, Radiohead, The Beatles, Sleater-Kinney, The Ronettes, Patti Smith, Wire, Jawbreaker, Beyoncé, Neil Young and was made available as a free download on SoundCloud.

=== More Is The Pity and 7-inch Singles ===
For their 7th LP More Is The Pity, The Sour Notes released a series of limited edition 7-inch singles, spanning the album from 2019-2020. Individual titles include "Peak / Dandy", "Shoulda / Enough", "Gold / Best", "Camera / Reel" and "More is the Pity (Rain) / Tradeoff". The band continues to play in and around the U.S.

== Discography ==
=== Studio albums ===
- More Is The Pity (2020)
- This Is Not Our Music (2018)
- Darkest Sour (2017)
- Do What May (2014)
- Last Looks (2011)
- It’s Not Gonna Be Pretty (2010)
- Received in Bitterness (2009)

=== Singles and EPs ===
- More is the Pity (Rain) / Tradeoff 7-inch (2020)
- Camera / Reel 7-inch (2020)
- Gold / Best 7-inch (2019)
- Shoulda / Enough 7-inch (2019)
- Peak / Dandy 7-inch (2019)
- Finest Sour 7-inch (2018)
- Do What May Remix EP (2014)
- In the Meanwhile Cassingle (2013)
- Split 7-inch w/ Marmalakes (2012)
- Hot Pink Flares 7-inch (2010)
- Never Mix, Never Worry 7-inch (2009)
- The Meat of the Fruit EP (2008)

=== Videography ===
- Shoulda (Dir. Carolyn Deskin, 2021)
- Dandy (Dir. Vineet Gordhandas, 2020)
- Peak (Dir. Michael Martin, 2020)
- Welcome To The Club (Dir. Andy Ray Lemon, 2018)
- Clock Strikes Twelve (Dir. Ofer Shouval, 2018)
- Ride It Out (Dir. Travis Hackett, 2017)
- Don’t Listen (Dir. Jared Boulanger, 2015)
- Do What May (Dir. Eric Morales, 2014)
- Two Hands Wait (Dir. Paul Raila, 2014)
- In the Meanwhile (Dir. Paul Raila, 2013)
- Last Looks (Dir. VidKidz, 2012)
- Tour Documentary (Dir. Jared Boulanger, 2012)
- Nothing’s More Contagious Than Evil (Dir. Laura Wallgren, 2012)
- Beyond Recognition (Dir. Jared Boulanger, 2010)
- A Cute Little Ruin (Dir. Eric Morales, 2010)
- Psychological Thriller (Dir. Paul Raila, 2009)
- Is It Happening? (Dir. Jared Boulanger, 2008)
