= The Lies We Tell Ourselves =

EP by thelastplaceyoulook
- Released: May 30, 2006 (U.S.)
- Recorded: January–April, 2006
- Genre: Alternative rock; hard rock; post-grunge; post-emo
- Length: 23:25
- Label: Independent
- Producer: John Glover & Marke Townsend

Thelastplaceyoulook chronology
The Lies We Tell Ourselves (2006)	See the Light Inside You (2009)

Singles from The Lies We Tell Ourselves
- 1. "I've Got a Question for You . . . Why Are You Still Here?"

The Lies We Tell Ourselves is an extended play album by American rock band thelastplaceyoulook. It was released on May 30, 2006 and produced by John Glover and Marke Townsend. The first single is "I've Got a Question for You ... Why Are You Still Here?". Space City Rock categorized the album as having a much different sound from the band's full-length follow up See The Light Inside You.

== Track listing ==
1. "I've Got a Question for You ... Why Are You Still Here?" – 4:13
2. "They Only Give Medals to Heroes" – 4:00
3. "No, This Song Wasn't About You" – 4:56
4. "Brass Rings Don't Hold Water in the Desert" – 4:18
5. "How Do You Say F**K Off in Russian?" – 5:47

== Album credits ==
All songs written by thelastplaceyoulook

=== Band ===
- Justin Nava – vocals
- Kevin Pool – bass & vocals
- Derek Young – guitar
- Richard Sherwood – guitar
- Mikey Garcia – drums
- Andy Moths – drums (former member)

=== Production ===
- John Glover – Producer, Engineering, Mixing
- Marke Townsend – Producer
- thelastplaceyoulook – Producers
- Justin Nava – Producer, Engineering
