= United Visual Artists =

UK art practice

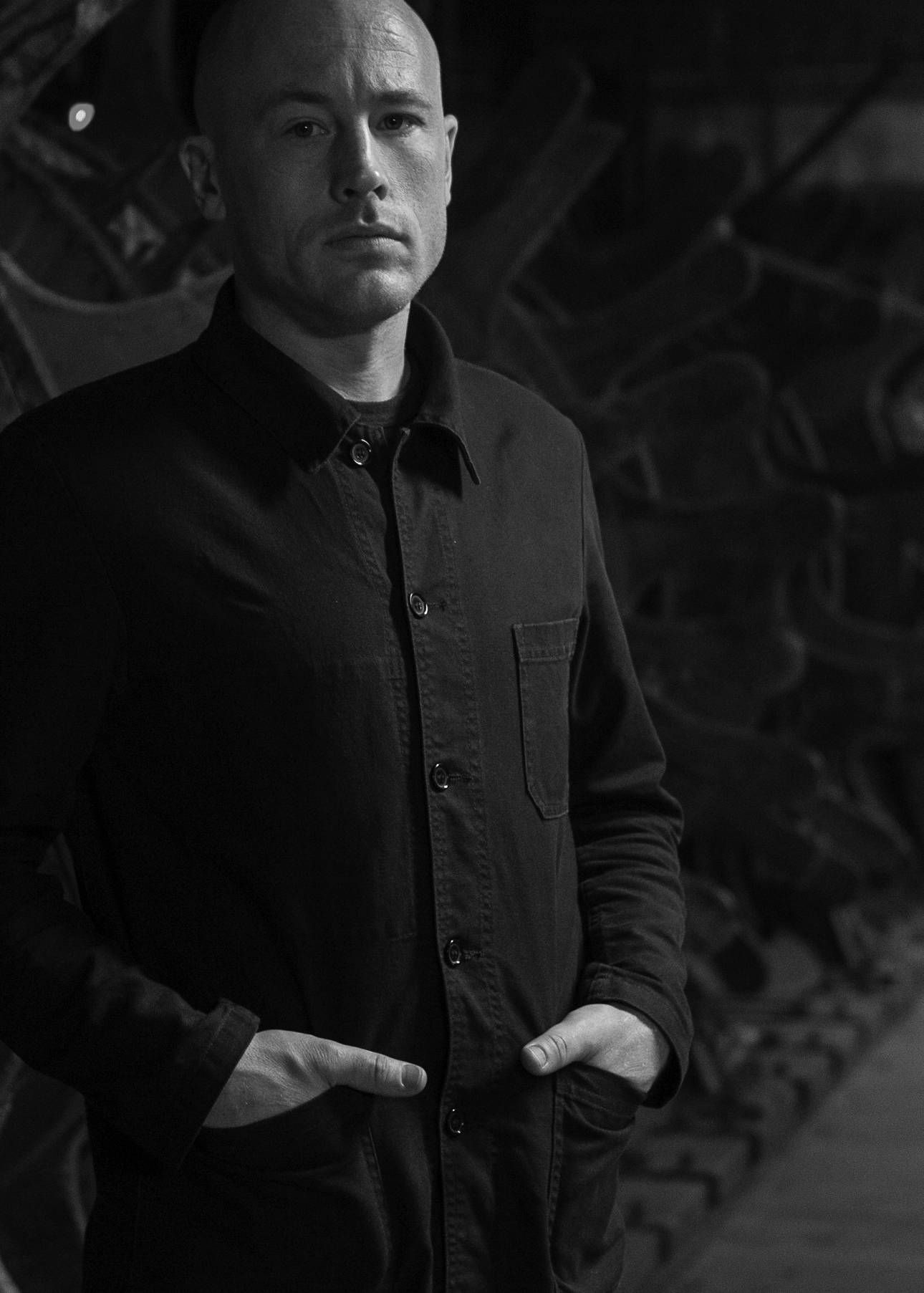
Matt Clark, Founder of United Visual Artists

United Visual Artists (UVA) is a London-based art practice founded in 2003 by British artist Matt Clark (b.1974). UVA's diverse body of work integrates new technologies with traditional media such as painting, sculpture, performance, and site-specific installation. The practice has an open and inclusive approach to collaboration. While Clark leads the UVA team, the plural use of the word "Artist" in its designation refers to the many collaborators with whom Clark works.

Drawing from sources ranging from ancient philosophy to theoretical science, the practice explores the cultural frameworks and natural phenomena that shape our cognition, creating instruments that manipulate our perception and expose the relativity of our experiences. Rather than material objects, UVA's works are better understood as events in time, in which the performance of light, sound and movement unfolds.

UVA has been commissioned internationally by institutions including the Barbican Curve Gallery, London, England; Manchester International Festival, Manchester, England; Royal Academy of Arts, London, England; Serpentine Gallery, London, England; The Wellcome Trust, London, England; Towner Gallery, East Sussex, England; Victoria & Albert Museum, London, England; YCAM, Tokyo, Japan, and others. Previous group exhibitions include Blain|Southern London, England; Riflemaker London, England; Bryce Wolkowitz, New York; Seoul Museum of Art, Seoul, Korea; and Power Station of Art Shanghai, China.

UVA has collaborated with artists including choreographer Benjamin Millepied and the Paris Opéra Ballet, filmmaker Adam Curtis, and musicians Massive Attack, Battles, and James Blake. Most recently UVA collaborated with Christopher Bailey for the Autumn/Winter 2018 fashion runway show at Burberry.

== Collections ==
UVA's work is represented in public and private collections including the Fondation Cartier, France and MONA, Australia. Public works are sited internationally in Toronto, Dubai, Philadelphia and London.

== Notable works ==
=== Our Time (2016) ===
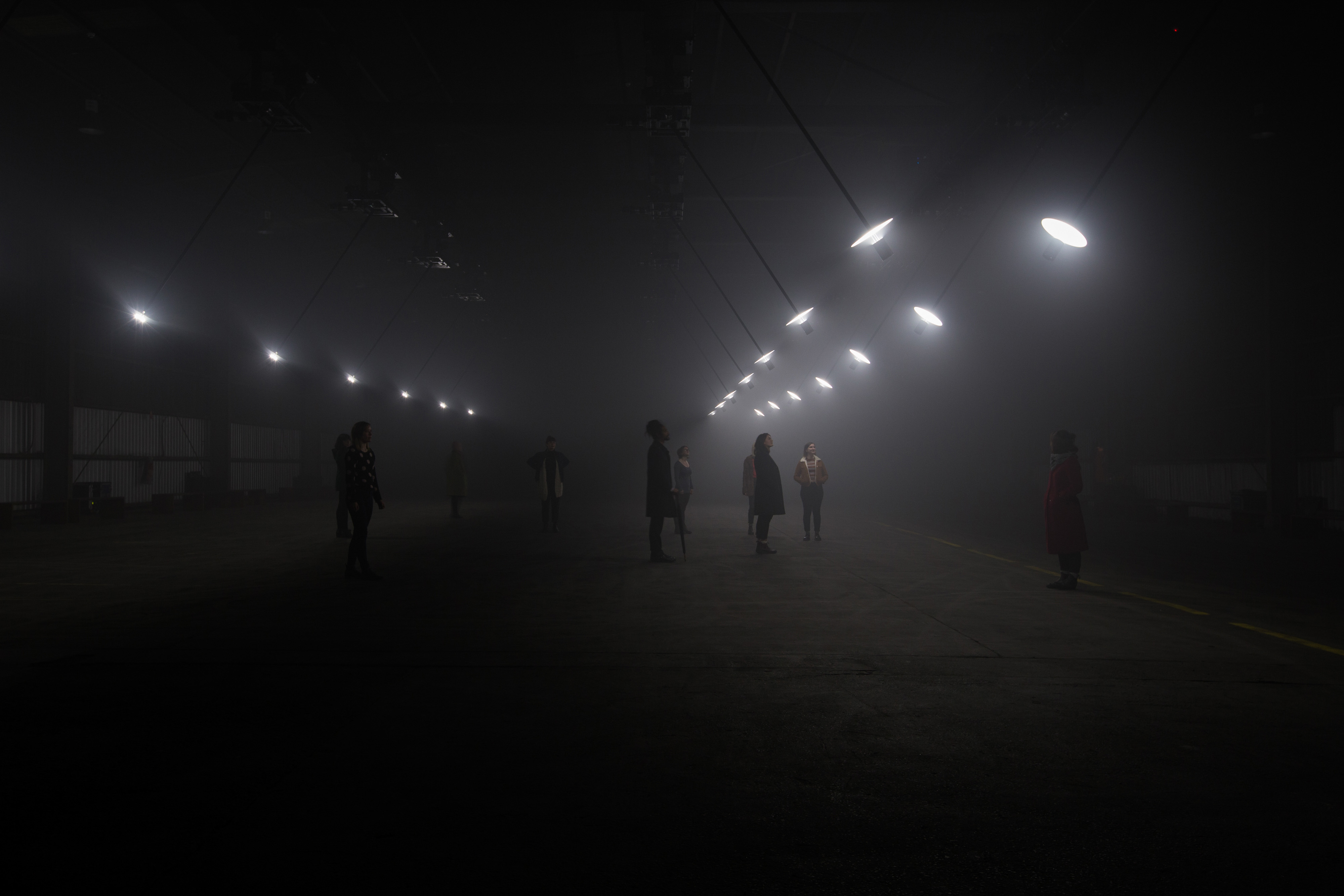
Image of 'Our Time', United Visual Artists, 2018

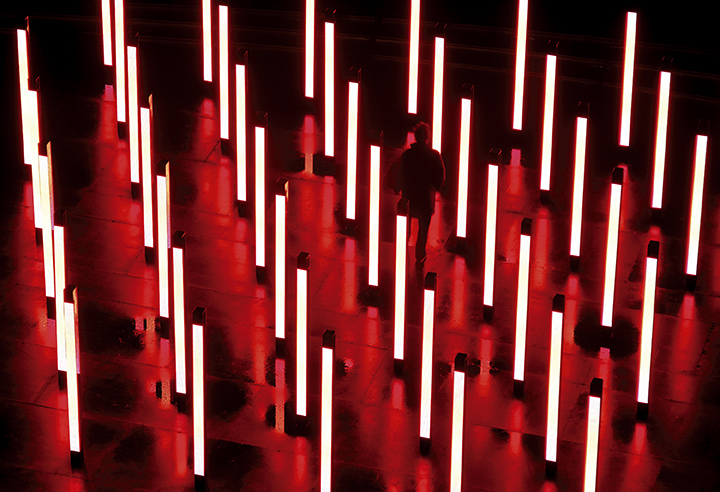
Image of 'Volume', United Visual Artists, 2006

Our Time is a large-scale installation consisting of 21 pendulums, each with two light sources that trace light paths across space and respond to sounds, echoes and prompts from within an intricately designed program. The work joins a series of kinetic sculptures that began with Momentum (2013), an installation designed as a "spatial instrument" that reveals the relationship between expectation and perception in physical space.

The work seeks to investigate the subjective experience of the passing of time. "How long is a moment? At what rate does time actually pass?"

Our Time was originally commissioned by Dark Mofo before being acquisitioned by MONA, Tasmania. The work was later used in Christopher Bailey's final runway show for Burberry.

=== Momentum (2013) ===
Momentum was originally commissioned by the Barbican Centre for its unique 90m long Curve gallery. It was the first in a series of kinetic sculptures created by the studio.

Using light, sound, and movement UVA transformed the Curve into a spatial instrument, installing a sequence of pendulum-like elements throughout the gallery to create an evolving composition of light and sound. The pendulums projected shadows and planes of light across the 6 metre-high walls and curved floor of the space.

Visitors each had a unique experience of the work according to their movement, and the movement of the pendulums. Momentum is one of the gallery's most popular exhibitions to date with over 77,500 visitors, an average of 717 visitors per day.

=== Volume (2006) ===
UVA's large-scale installation Volume first appeared in the garden of London's V&A museum in 2006 and has since toured far as Hong Kong, Taiwan, St. Petersburg, Paris and Melbourne.

The work consists of a field of 48 luminous, sound-emitting columns that respond to movement. Visitors are encouraged to weave a path through the sculpture, creating their own unique journey in light and music.

Volume won a Yellow Pencil at the D&AD awards and featured in the London Design Museum's "Design of the Year" show in 2008.

== Selected works ==
- Hidden Order, a projection mapping installation on the Casa Batlló's exterior, Barcelona, to mark the 100th anniversary of Antoni Gaudí's death (2026).
- Beholder, commissioned by Birmingham Open Media gallery (2018)
- Spirit of the City, commissioned by A/D/O (2018)
- Elements, commissioned by A/D/O (2018)
- Flux painting (2017)
- New Dawn (2017)
- Etymologies (2017)
- A Distant View (2017)
- 440Hz commissioned by MONA for Dark Mofo (2016)
- Musica Universalis, commissioned by Day for Night Festival (2016)
- Message from the Unseen World, curated by Future City commissioned by British Land for Paddington Central (2016)
- Heliostat, commissioned by The Crown Estate for 7 Air St (2015)
- Principles of Motion (2014 - 2015)
- Parallels (2014)
- Blueprint (2014)
- Formation, commissioned by Artwise for Here Today (2014)
- Momentum, commissioned by the Barbican Centre for the Curve Gallery, London (2014)
- Continuum (2013)
- Fragment, commissioned by the Chalhoub Group (2013)
- Vanishing Point (2012 - 2013)
- Always/Never (2012)
- Rien a Cacher rein a Craindre (2011)
- Linnaeus, commissioned by Artwise for the Capability Brown restaurant in Syon Park, London(2011)
- Canopy, commissioned by Cadillac Fairview, Lanterra Developments, Maple Leaf Square (2010)
- Onward, commissioned by the Royal Academy for the Burlington Arcade (2009)
- Array, commissioned by Chuya Nakahara Memorial Museum (2008)
- Triptych, commissioned by onedotzero as a part of Nuit Blanche (2007)
- Hereafter (2007)
- Mirror (2005)
- Monolith, commissioned by the V&A for the John Madejski garden (2005)

== Selected collaborations ==
- Bernie Krause, Great Animal Orchestra, commissioned by Fondation Cartier (2016)
- James Blake, The Colour in Anything, World Tour (2016)
- Benjamin Millepied, Clear, Loud, Bright, Forward (2015)
- Sou Fujimoto, Serpentine Pavilion Intervention commissioned by the Serpentine Gallery (2013)
- Adam Curtis, Massive Attack vs Adam Curtis (2013)
- Nick Drake, High Arctic, commissioned by the National Maritime Museum (2011)
- Scanner, Origin, commissioned by The Creators Project New York (2011)
- Mimbre, Echo (2011)
- Battles, Tonto Music Video(2007)
- Mira Calix, Chorus (2009)
- Massive Attack, World Tours (2003-2018)

== Personnel ==
- Matt Clark - Founder
- Will Laslett - Head of Design and Development
- Maximo Recio - Lead Designer
- Willem Kempers - Designer
- Lee Sampson - Designer

Matt Clark founded UVA in 2003 together with Chris Bird and Ash Nehru. Around 2010, Chris and Ash turned their focus to D3 - a software tool originally developed for UVA projects, and at the end of 2017 they both moved on from UVA as directors to pursue their personal interests.
