= Jake Childs =

American singer

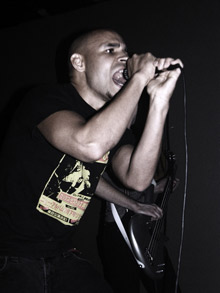
- Jake Childs performs in San Antonio, Texas, in June 2009 with his electro-punk band POSR.

Background information
- Also known as: Paparazzi; Morning Star; Lil' Prince; POSR; MNYNMS; Eleven:Eleven
- Born: Jake Childs
- Origin: Austin, Texas, U.S.
- Genres: Techno, House, Ghetto house, Electro-punk
- Occupation: Record producer
- Instruments: Vocals, guitar, bass, keyboard, Sampler, Drum machine, Mixer
- Years active: 1999–present
- Labels: UNI.FORM Recordings, Universal Music Canada, Freerange, Drop Music; Om Records
- Website: Jake Childs

Jake Childs is an American record producer. He was born in Austin, Texas, and started playing music early in life, following in the footsteps of his father who played trumpet professionally with the Navy Jazz Band. Childs learned to play trumpet, guitar, bass and keyboard.

Childs’ musical career as a house music producer and DJ started in Houston where he became a fan of a house radio show and began attending weekly house music events. Childs founded the record label Uni.form Recordings in 2002, which allowed him to collaborate with like-minded musicians, producers and DJs.

Childs' has performed his self-produced music on multiple international tours. He has played in the United States, Iceland, Bulgaria, Netherlands, Germany, Russia, Siberia, Switzerland, Belgium, Mexico and South Africa. He organized "some of the biggest raves in San Antonio, which were legendary" according to an October 2006 article on Underground House.

In 2009, another incarnation of Childs’ musical creativity, POSR, an electro-punk band from Austin, signed a record deal with Houston’s Tierra Studios in May 2009. The band includes Childs as its producer, songwriter and singer; duel bassists Illson and Chris Casual, and DJ Adam Warped.

Childs' project during 2010 to 2013, Eleven:Eleven, fronted by vocalist Sicca and accompanied by Childs on production.

Childs' project as of October 2014, MNYNMS, is fronted by Jessica Wahlquist, with a much slower essence that is synth driven.

== Discography ==
=== Releases ===
- 2002 – Back To Basics (Dedicated Musique)
- 2003 – The Next Generation EP Part 2 (Soul Phusion Records)
- 2004 – Lies (Housetown Records)
- 2005 – Bring It (Offset Music)
- 2005 – Can You Feel Me (Icon Recordings)
- 2005 – Feel It (Seasons Recordings)
- 2005 – Hidden Agenda (Drop Music)
- 2005 – Orange Gravy Sampler (Tango Recordings)
- 2005 – Someone Else (Housetown Records)
- 2005 – The Life of a Hustler (Drop Music)
- 2005 – Tricks of the Trade EP (Uniform Recordings)
- 2006 – 11:11 EP (Uniform Recordings)
- 2006 – Bound To Isis EP (Photo Records)
- 2006 – Duality of Horus EP (Lost My Dog)
- 2006 – Easy Game EP (Doubledown Recordings)
- 2006 – In Love with a Psychic (Jamayka Recordings)
- 2006 – Inside (Seasons Recordings)
- 2006 – Invisible Inc. EP (Uniform Recordings)
- 2006 – Makin' Moves EP (Bunchlox Music)
- 2006 – Texas To Cali EP (Uniform Recordings)
- 2006 – The Pain (Freerange Records)
- 2007 – Illuminati EP (Mouth To Mouth Recordings)
- 2008 – Pictures of You (Support House)
- 2008 – The Underground (Dust Traxx)
- 2009 – Blow Up My Phone (Innuendo)
- 2009 – Sex & Drums Remix EP Vol. 1 (Stripped Recordings UK)

=== Remixes ===
- 2004 – Soundz (Uniform Recordings)
- 2005 – Amnesia Ibiza Underground #5 – Sessions Vol. Eleven (DJ Center Records, Fiftyfive Records)
- 2005 – Jam Sandwich EP (Myna)
- 2005 – Sessions (Comp) (Ministry of Sound)
- 2006 – No Addiction Without Good Reason EP (Flat & Round)
- 2006 – OM Winter Sampler (DJ Magazine)
- 2006 – Pump Dance Part 2 (12") (D'lectable)
- 2006 – Tech No (Icon Recordings)
- 2007 – Huh...? Sampler Vol 1 (Wot Recordings)
- 2007 – Lovelee Dae (Om Records)
- 2007 – OM:Ibiza 2007 (OM Records)
- 2007 – They Forgot It (OM Records)
- 2007 – Woman Of The Sun Part 2 (OM Records)
- 2008 – Cafè Solaire 14 (Soulstar)
- 2008 – Miami Aftermath WMC 2008 (People INgrooves)
- 2008 – Scandalism (Boogie Basics)
- 2008 – We Are Free (Soulstar)

=== Production ===
- 2007 – Join In The Chant (Icon Recordings)

=== Appears on ===
- 2005 – Alcyone EP (Freerange Records)
- 2005 – Heart Breaker EP (Uniform Recordings)
- 2006 – Funky City Remixed (Dust Traxx)
- 2006 – Not Wot You Got (Lost My Dog)
- 2006 – Play Deep House – Third Chapter (Soulstar)
- 2007 – Addicted To House Vol. 6 (Soulstar)
- 2007 – Live In Tokyo (OM Records)
- 2007 – Pink 2 (Swank Recordings)
- 2007 – They Forgot It (OM Records)

=== Tracks appear on ===
- 2005 – Fetish Sampler Vol. 1 (Fetish Recordings)
- 2005 – OM: 10 A Decade Of Future Music V.2 Downtempo (OM Records)
- 2005 – Submerged In Sound – Voyage Three (Safe In Sound Music)
- 2005 – Республика КаZантип – Sanches (World Club Music)
- 2006 – Best Of Various Other Artists (Drop Music)
- 2006 – Craig De Sousa "Everything" Sundown To Sunup (USM Records)
- 2006 – Music For A Changing World (Control Recordings)
- 2006 – OM 10: A Decade Of Future Music (OM Records)
- 2006 – Play Deep House – Third Chapter (Soulstar)
- 2006 – Purobeach – Volumen Dos (Seamless Recordings)
- 2006 – Skin Is In (Dessous Recordings)
- 2006 – Steve Porter Presents Porterhouse (Fade Records)
- 2007 – Addicted To House Vol. 6 (Soulstar)
- 2007 – Deep Side Of The City (Sleeping Giant Music)
- 2007 – Live In Tokyo (OM Records)
- 2007 – Mouth To Mouth 2007 Sampler (Mouth To Mouth Recordings)
- 2007 – Pink 2 (Swank Recordings)
- 2008 – Seasons Recordings House Session 2 (Soulstar)
- 2009 – Seasons Recordings Volume 3 (Seasons Recordings)
