= Doughbeezy =

American rapper

- Also known as: The South East Beast
- Born: Tai Charles Carr; 1986 (age 39–40)
- Origin: Houston, Texas, United States
- Genres: Hip hop, Southern hip hop
- Occupation: Rapper
- Years active: 2010–present
- Label: Headwreckas Worldwide
- Website: http://www.doughbeezy.com/

Tai Charles Carr (born 1986, Houston, Texas), better known by his stage name Doughbeezy, is an American rapper from Houston, Texas. Active since 2010, he has released a number of mixtapes and collaborated with musicians such as Killa Kyleon, Bun B, Slim Thug, Devin The Dude, and Paul Wall. Doughbeezy won the “Best Rapper In Texas” competition three times, and in 2013 MTV Hive named him one of the "top 5 underground artists in Houston." A frequent live performer, he has toured with rappers such as Dom Kennedy, and is co-CEO of the music company Headwreckas Worldwide, along with company founder Al Hughes.

== Early life ==
Tai Carr was born in Cleveland, Ohio in 1986, where he was raised primarily by his mother after his parents split up. He and his mother moved to Southeast Houston, Texas, when he was 13. He started rapping at age 15, gaining his nickname Doughbeezy and rapping casually in free-style battles with friends in his high school (Clear Brook). According to Doughbeezy, “It started to become a normal thing where people would actually skip their lunch and come to ours, just to watch the free-styles."

== Music career ==
=== 2010–13: Early years and mixtapes ===
While living near Houston in Webster, Texas, Doughbeezy began to do rap features in his late teens, working for a time with local rap group The TMI Boys, who did a song with Manny Fresh. After choosing not to sign a contract and join the group on a major label, he instead stayed local, supported by friends and his manager Al Hughes. Early on he’d often perform three or more shows a night.

In 2010 Doughbeezy entered The Best Rapper in Texas contest, and while he lost the first time, he won the next three consecutive contests, choosing to retire from the contest after his fourth entry. Also around that time he began attending the underground music event Kickback Sundays, which are hosted at the Houston clothing store SF2 once a week.

In 2010 he released his first EP, No Money, No Conversation, on Headwreckas Worldwide. His first full mixtape, Reggie Bush and Kool-Aid, came out in April 2011. According to the Houston Press in 2011, "[Doughbeezy's rap] flow, somehow preternaturally polished, is enjoyable for a lot of reasons, but the most impressive is that he seems to be able to effortlessly tie together the strong, young, brash psyche of the New Houston Collective with the organic, soulful, drank-drenched psyche of the old heads." Doughbeezy's second full mixtape, Blue Magic, was released in March 2012 and has guest appearances from rappers such as Bun B, Slim Thug, Kirko Bangz, Killa Kyleon and Chalie Boy.

Before its release in February 2013, his third album Footprints On the Moon was named of one of the "Fall's most anticipated Houston rap releases" by Houston Press. Eight other MCs beside Doughbeezy have guest appearances on the 16 tracks. According to a positive review in the Austin Chronicle, "Doughbeezy's lightning-quick, nasal delivery is still welcome by track 15, 'Bang Bang,' a violent gunshot beat emptied over Nancy Sinatra remodeling, reinforces his appeal. 'Lift[ing] Off' kills with bravado so twisted you'd need a shrink to break it down."

In early 2013, MTV Hive named him one of the current top 5 underground artists in Houston. He was nominated in two categories at the 2013 Houston Press Music Awards, in the categories "local musician of the year" and "best solo rapper."

=== 2013–present: Collaborations and touring ===
Doughbeezy has contributed as a rapper to a number of tracks by musicians such as Emilio Rojas, and worked with Killa Kyleon on the 2013 single and album Watch Chrome. He has also released a number of music videos, notably one for his 2013 track "Ridin' Round." He is co-CEO of the music company Headwreckas Worldwide along with his manager Al Hughes, who founded the company.

He tours frequently, at one point touring with Dom Kennedy. He performed at SXSW in 2012, 2013, and March 2014. In 2012 and 2013 he also performed at the A3C Hip Hop Festival, and in 2013 he performed at Houston Free Press Summer Fest. In 2014 he performed at the SCOPE Show in its first Unplugged Series.

== Discography ==
=== Extended plays ===
List of extended plays and selected details
Title	Album details
No Money, No Conversation EP	Released: 2010; Label: Headwreckas Worldwide; Format: Digital

=== Mixtapes ===
List of mixtapes and selected details
Mixtape	Album details
Reggie Bush and Kool-Aid	Released: April 20, 2011; Label: Headwreckas Worldwide; Format: Digital
Blue Magic	Released: March 2012; Label: Headwreckas Worldwide; Format: Digital
Footprints On The Moon	Released: February 4, 2014; Label: Headwreckas Worldwide; Format: Digital
Reggie Bush and Kool-Aid 2	Released: March 7, 2016; Label: Headwreckas Worldwide; Format: Digital
King Beezy	Released: February 27, 2018; Label: Headwreckas Worldwide; Format: Digital

=== Singles ===
- 2014: "She On Top" (featuring Beat King)
- 2014: "I'm From Texas"
- 2014: "Crusin" (featuring Slim Thug)

=== Guest appearances ===
- 2012: "Let's Get That (Remix)" (Chamillionaire featuring Doughbeezy & Marcus Manchild)
- 2013: "Fire" (Emilio Rojas featuring Killa Kyleon and Doughbeezy)
- 2013: "Watch the Chrome" Killa Kyleon and Doughbeezy)
- 2013: "Ridin' Thru My City" (Roosh Williams featuring Doughbeezy)
- 2013: "Hittin' It" (Short Tempa featuring L.E.$ and Doughbeezy)
- 2013: "Texas Boys" (Damilare featuring DJ Chose, Young Von, E.S.G., Maxo Kream, and Doughbeezy)
- 2013: "Rhymes For Months" (Dante Higgins featuring Doughbeezy and Propain)
- 2013: "Never" by (Luke Duke featuring Doughbeezy)
- 2013: "Set It Off" (Easy Yves Saint featuring Doughbeezy)
- 2013: "Nothing But That Screw" (Dat Boi T featuring Doughbeezy and Young G)
- 2013: "Let Me Get" (Mr. 16 featuring Doughbeezy)
- 2013: "Louder" (Propain featuring Doughbeezy)
- 2014: "Make A Killin'" (Track Whippaz featuring Doughbeezy, Rob Gullatte and Mac Fame)
- 2014: "Get Loaded" (with Fiend, Mookie Jones, and Paul Wall) off Intervention Episode 2
- 2014: "Lifted" (with Devin the Dude) off Intervention Episode 2

=== Music videos ===
- 2014: "I'm From Texas"
- 2014: "Ridin' Round"
- 2013: "Hittin' It" (Short Tempa featuring L.E.$ and Doughbeezy)
- 2013: "Nothing But That Screw" (Dat Boi T featuring Doughbeezy and Young G)
- 2013: "Let Me Get" (Mr. 16 featuring Doughbeezy)
