= The Tontons =

American indie rock group

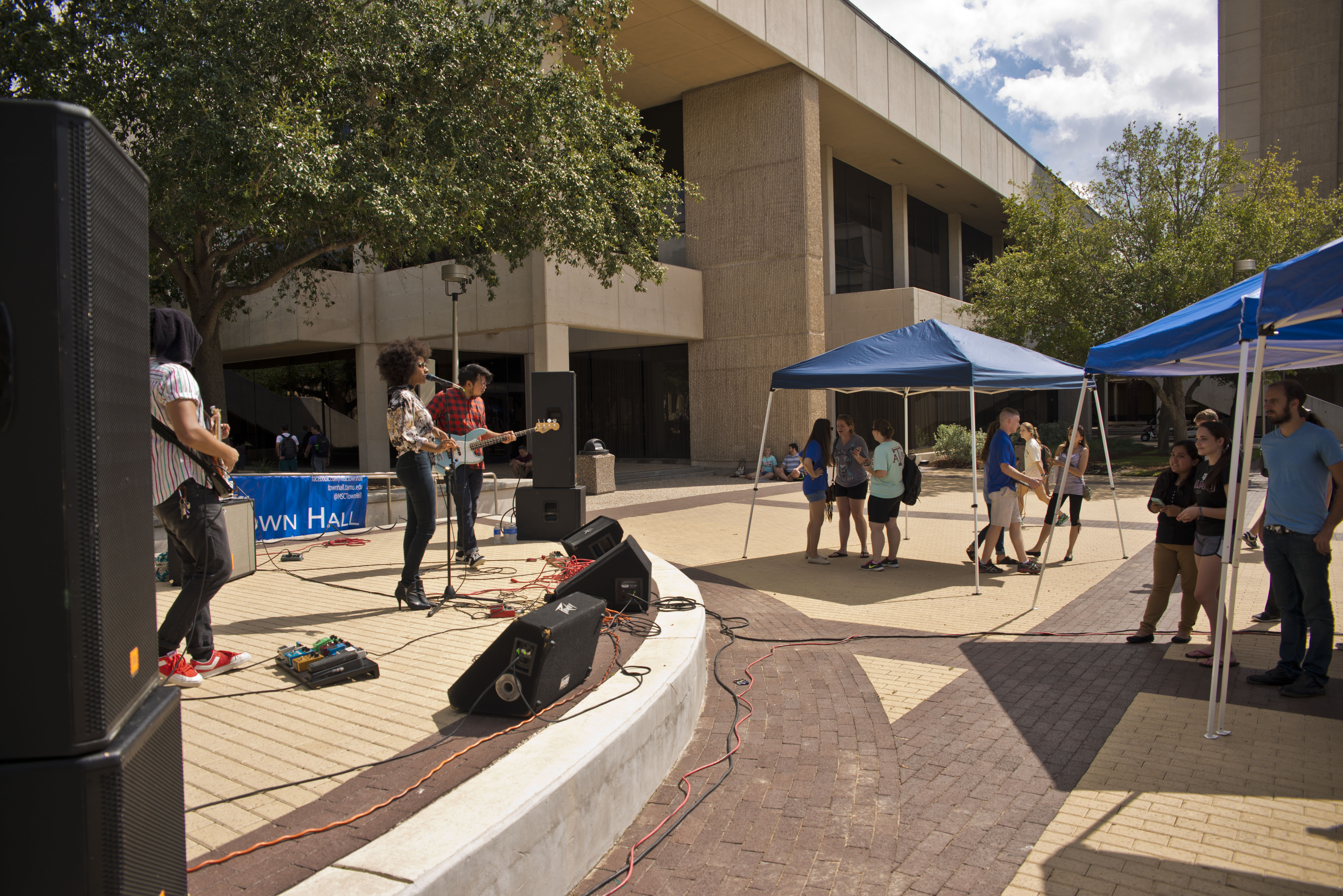

Background information
- Origin: Houston, Texas, U.S.
- Years active: 2007–present
- Members: Asli Omar; Tom Nguyen; Adam Martinez; Justin Martinez
- Website: www.thetontons.com

The Tontons are an indie rock band from Houston, Texas consisting of lead vocalist Asli Omar, bassist Tom Nguyen, guitarist Adam Martinez, and drummer Justin Martinez. They were formed in 2007.

They have received two Houston Press Music Awards, including "Best New Act" of 2008 and "Best Local Recording" in 2014. In 2010, the Houston Chronicle named their debut album as one of the "Favorite Local Albums of The Decade", and in 2011 it was named one of the best local albums by both Houston Chronicle and Houston Press. Bun B has referred to them as the "best band in Houston". The Tontons have been covered by SPIN, The New York Times, The Wall Street Journal, Paste, MTV, and CMJ.

== Discography ==
=== Studio albums ===
- The Tontons (2009)
- Make Out King and Other Stories of Love (2014)

=== EPs ===
- Sea and Stars (2008)
- Golden (2011)
- Heat (2020)
