= Grandfather Child =

- Origin: Houston, Texas, USA
- Genres: Indie rock
- Years active: 2009–present
- Labels: New West
- Members: Lucas Gorham, vocals/lap steel Ryan Chavez, drums Robert Ellis, bass, guitar Geoffrey Muller, guitar, bass

Grandfather Child is a rock band based in Houston, Texas. Using lap steel guitar instead of the traditional two electric guitar line-up, Grandfather Child has created a sound that mixes country, Gospel, as well as rhythm and blues.

== History ==
Grandfather Child was founded in 2009 by Lucas Gorham as he left the punk rock group Satin Hooks. He formed the band originally as a trio, with Ryan Chavez, drums, and Mark Speer, bass with the goal to explore the music he had discovered in a film about Gospel music, called Sacred Steel. Speer left the group after several months and Gorham contacted Robert Ellis and Geoffrey Muller to split the bass role and add a guitar.

All the members of the group are busy members of the Houston music scene, including I am Mesmer (which is led by Muller), Robert Ellis and the Boys (which includes Chavez and Muller), Sideshow Tramps (Muller), Screwed Anthologies (Gorham), and many others. Perhaps because of the many different calls upon the musicians' time, the music made is somewhat a middle ground between all of the side projects.

Grandfather Child was awarded Best EP / 7” in 2010 for Waiting for You by Houston Press Music Awards and was later listed as one of 2010's Houston Music's People of the Year. They were signed to New West Records in 2011 and played at SXSW in March 2012 and will release a full-length in August 2012.

== Discography ==
- 2010 Waiting for You
- 2012 Grandfather Child

== See also ==
- Sacred Steel (musical tradition)
- Official Website
