= See the Light Inside You =

Studio album by thelastplaceyoulook
- Released: January 29, 2009 (U.S.)
- Recorded: August–December, 2008
- Genre: Alternative rock Hard rock Post-grunge; Post-emo
- Length: 32:50
- Label: Independent
- Producer: Will Hoffman

Thelastplaceyoulook chronology
| The Lies We Tell Ourselves (2006) | See the Light Inside You (2009) |

Singles from See the Light Inside You
- 1. "Don't Make It So Easy"; 2. "Band to Save Me"

See the Light Inside You is the first full-length album by American rock band thelastplaceyoulook. It was released on January 29, 2009, and produced by thelastplaceyoulook and Will Hoffman. The first single is "Don't Make it So Easy" and the music video was produced by Taylor Gahm and released on July 13, 2009. The second single "Band to Save Me" has been added to rotation on Clear Channel's 94.5 KTBZ The Buzz. "Don't Make It so Easy" and "Band to Save Me" were both nominated for the Houston Press Music Awards. "Band to Save Me" was also featured on Escaping The Ordinary's compilation album, Escaping The Ordinary: Volume Two.

The music video for "Band to Save Me" was released on September 5, 2011.

== Track listing ==
1. "Promise of Something True" - 0:53
2. "Just Let It Go" - 3:47
3. "Lie to the Silence" - 3:28
4. "Interlude" - 0:42
5. "Don't Make It So Easy" - 3:36
6. "I Know You Think Nobody Cares..." - 3:34
7. "Say That You'll Understand" - 3:40
8. "Band to Save Me" - 3:56
9. "Hopestar" - 4:48
10. "Take the Time" - 4:05

== Music videos ==
1. "Don't Make It So Easy" - 3:36
2. "Band to Save Me (Live)" - 4:40

== Album credits ==
All songs written by thelastplaceyoulook / W.Hoffman / except "Take The Time", I Know You Think Nobody Cares", and "Band to Save Me" which were written by thelastplaceyoulook.

=== Band ===
- Justin Nava - vocals
- Kevin Pool - bass & vocals
- Derek Young - guitar
- Richard Sherwood - guitar
- Mikey Garcia - drums
- Andy Moths - drums (former member)

=== Additional musicians ===
- Tony Park - Vocals
- Lynz Lab - Voice
- Will Hoffman - Programming

=== Production ===
- Will Hoffman – Producer, Engineering, Mixing
- thelastplaceyoulook - Producers
- Justin Nava- Producer, Engineering
- Jerry Nettles- Producer
