= Free Press Houston =

American newspaper in Texas (2003–2018)

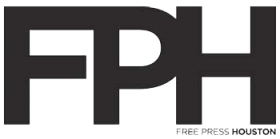
- Format: Periodical
- Owner: Steve Harter
- Publisher: Mills McCoin
- Managing editor: Daniel Renfrow
- Founded: 2003; 23 years ago
- Ceased publication: 2018; 8 years ago
- Political alignment: Far-left; Liberal; Progressive
- Circulation: 30,000
- Website: freepresshoustonarchive.com

Free Press Houston was a free monthly newsprint publication focusing on arts, entertainment, culture and politics. Founded in March 2003 by Omar and Andrea Afra, Free Press Houston was distributed throughout the greater Houston area with particularly strong distribution in inner city neighborhoods such as Montrose, Heights, and the Houston Warehouse District.

== History ==
Free Press Houston began its publishing history in March 2003. Although independent of previous such publishing ventures in the Houston area, the original staff did include contributors from Houston-based alternative publications such as Houston's Other and Public News. However, Free Press Houston distinguished itself from these earlier ventures by expanding past merely focusing on Houston's art and music scene into liberal political commentary and controversial local issues like human trafficking. Free Press Houston is often considered by conservative circles to align themselves with left-wing and socialist politics due to their notable advocacy and defense of abortion, illegal immigration and same-sex marriage.

In 2018 financiers seized Afra's assets, including FPH, and had plans to sell them. Afra maintains the sale was deficient and legally revokable. A public auction was held at law office in Downtown Houston where the owner of Yellow Cab Houston, Steve Harter, sold it to himself.

== Westheimer Block Party and Free Press Summer Festival ==
Himself a performing musician and one-time bass guitar instructor, Free Press Houston publisher Omar Afra has long been interested in event production. This interest resulted in a small scale revival over several years (2005–2009) of Houston's legendary Westheimer Street Festival as the "Westheimer Block Party". Later, Mr. Afra went on to become the principal promoter of Free Press Summer Fest, a two-day annual event held in Eleanor Tinsley Park. Featuring headliners as diverse as Willie Nelson and Iggy Pop, Free Press Summer Festival has served to bring attention to Houston's active role within American musical culture and growing role within the U.S. Music industry. Summer Fest 2012 is estimated to have drawn well over 80,000 attendees.

== Omar Afra, Accusations of Sexual Harassment ==
In August 2018, Afra was accused of sexual harassment by two women. All accusations were dismissed by HPD and Harris County. An open records request from Houston Police Department summarized the incident by stating " No injuries, No evidence, No arrest." In response to the accusations Afra posted to his personal Facebook account, acknowledging behavior in which "I have veered away from what I knew was right and caused pain to those around me including family and friends," adding he was "saddened, shocked, and embarrassed...for the developments over the last several days." Afra announced he would step down from his positions at Free Press Houston, where he served as publisher and was removed from his role in the Day for Night festival.
