= Blackie (musician) =

American rapper

B L A C K I E
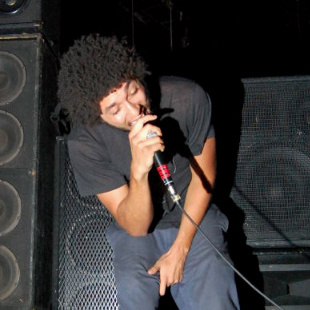
- Performing live at Numbers in Houston, 2008

Background information
- Born: Michael LaCour; April 22, 1987 (age 39); Houston, Texas, U.S.
- Genres: Industrial; hip hop; hardcore punk; noise; electronic; experimental; punk jazz
- Occupations: Rapper; songwriter; record producer; Musician
- Years active: 2005–present
- Label: TOOTH Records
- Website: b-l-a-c-k-i-e.com

Michael LaCour (born April 22, 1987), known by his stage name Blackie (styled in all caps with spaces, B L A C K I E) is an American rapper, songwriter, record producer, and musician. His experimental style combines hip hop, hardcore punk, noise, industrial and electronic.

== History ==
Michael LaCour first began B-L-A-C-K-I-E as a project through assembling his own sound systems; at one time his sound system was rumored to consist of over twenty speakers and to be estimated at more than 5,000 watts, and these sound systems would propel LaCour to local recognition. Often set up on the floors of nightclubs and warehouses, his massive speaker arrangement coupled with his energetic and many times unscheduled performances caused him to become legendary in Houston. He is featured on the cover of the book Houston Rap Tapes: An Oral History of Bayou City Hip-Hop.

== Music and style ==
LaCour's project has been called a "one-man noise ordinance violation", and his sound has been described as "equal parts fucked-up electronics, distorted pop-cult samples, guitar feedback, video game noise, and angry-as-hell street flow". He at one point called it "U.S. Grime" and "Thrash-Rap", among other names.

LaCour's energetic live performances, often engaging with crowds, made him a fan and college-radio favorite in the 2010s. LaCour has explained in interview that the spelling and spacing of the epithet that he uses as his stage name was chosen for visceral as well as aesthetic reasons. The artist states, "...I started writing it down, like over and over and when I would write it normal like just with the B capitalized it looked ugly, I didn’t like how it looked. Then I started writing it in all caps real big all over the paper and I thought it looked really intimidating, really good..."

== Discography ==
=== Albums ===
- Wilderness of North America (2008)
- Spred Luv LP (2009)
- GEN (2012)
- IMAGINE YOUR SELF IN A FREE AND NATURAL WORLD (2014)
- REMAINS (2017)
- FACE THE DARKNESS (2020)
- FACE THE DARKNESS II (2021)
- catharsis only (2023)
- Noise God (2024)

=== Extended plays ===
- B L A C K I E (2005)
- True Spirit and Not Giving a Fuck (2011)
- Fuck the False (2013)
