= Cynthia Woods Mitchell Pavilion =

Concert amphitheater in The Woodlands, Texas

Coordinates: 30°09′41″N 95°27′50″W

- The Woodlands Pavilion
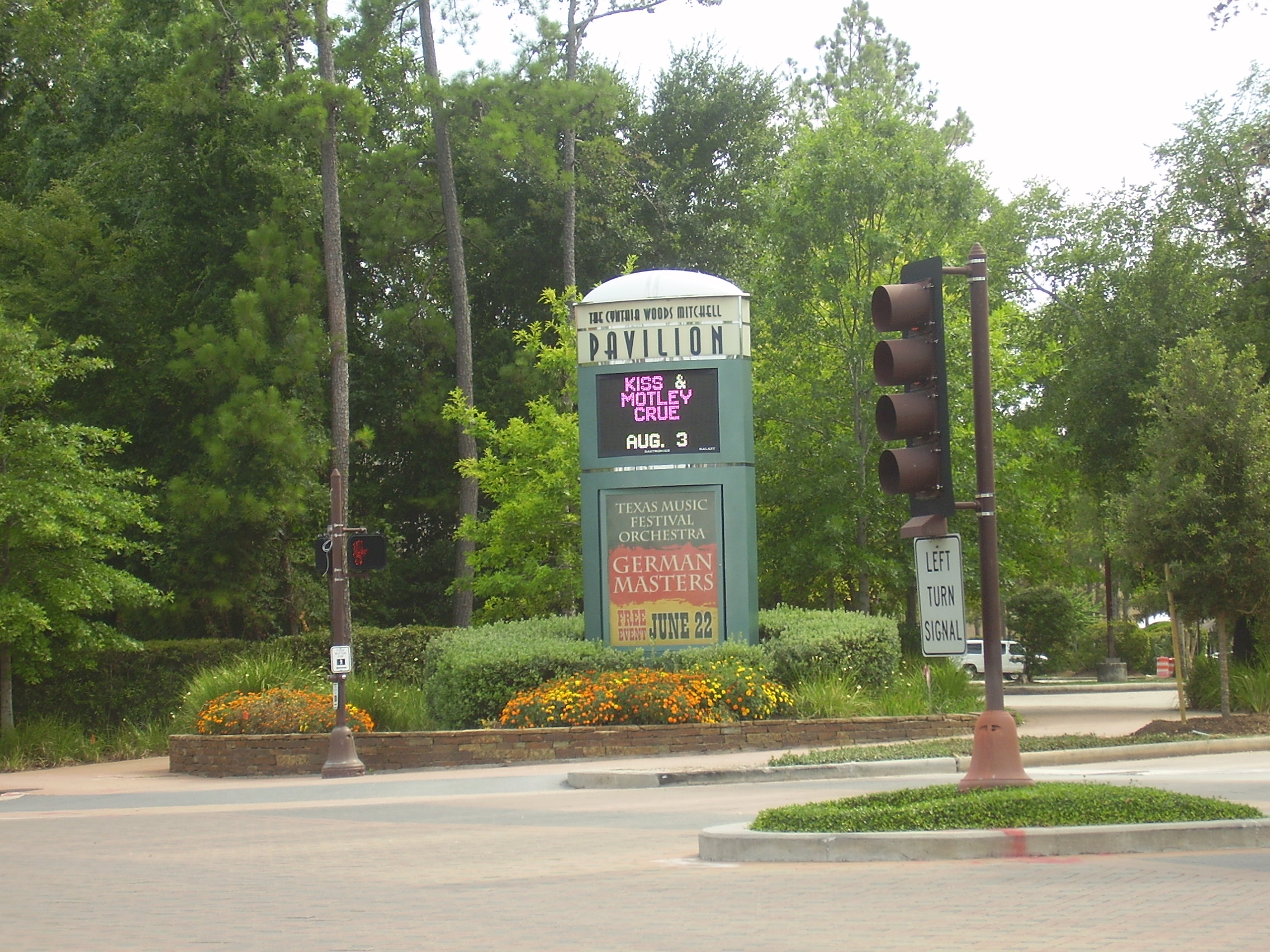
- Entrance to the venue (c. 2012)
- Address: 2005 Lake Robbins Dr; The Woodlands, TX 77380-1136
- Location: Greater Houston
- Owner: The Center for the Performing Arts at The Woodlands
- Operator: Live Nation
- Capacity: 16,500
- Type: Amphitheater

Construction
- Opened: April 27, 1990
- Renovated: 2008-09
- Expanded: 1995

Website
- Venue Website

The Cynthia Woods Mitchell Pavilion, commonly known as The Pavilion, is a concert amphitheater located in The Woodlands, Texas, an outer suburb of Houston, Texas. It caters to both the performing arts and contemporary artists and is also available for rental. It is owned and operated by The Center for the Performing Arts at The Woodlands and is a non-profit organization. In March 2014, Huntsman signed a five-year contract to be the pavilion's presenting sponsor. The amphitheater seats 16,500 people and has been the second-most heavily used amphitheater in the world. The venue features 6,500 covered seats and up to 10,000 uncovered lawn capacity.

== History ==
Civic leaders and members of the Houston Symphony approached The Woodlands founder George P. Mitchell in 1982 indicating a desire to establish a regional summer home for the Houston Symphony in The Woodlands. The facility was envisioned as a place where both performing arts groups and contemporary entertainers could perform. After an initial delay due to the region's economic situation, construction began in June 1989. The Pavilion's opening weekend in late April 1990 featured successive concerts by the Houston Symphony, Frank Sinatra, Alabama, and Clint Black. The venue is named for Mitchell's wife, Cynthia Woods Mitchell.

The original facility provided 3,000 reserved seats and room for 7,000 guests on a sloped grass lawn. Each plaza had one concession stand and restroom. The main entrance was located in the South Plaza, along with a four-window ticket office.

In 1994, The Pavilion's board of directors decided to expand the capacity and add additional amenities to the existing facility. An expansion plan was implemented to provide 1,900 new, uncovered reserved seats, to increase capacity by 1,100 on the lawn, and to build concession stands on the lawn. Each plaza was enhanced with new restrooms and concession stands. A ten-window ticket office and additional lanes for buses, limousines and vehicle drop-off area were added to the North Plaza as well.

In 1998, The Pavilion added new administrative offices for the expanding staff necessary to run a first-class performing arts center. Adjacent to the North Plaza and the Gold Parking Lot, the offices comprise approximately 6,000 square feet (560 m^{2}) of space for the administrative staff. In conjunction with the office addition, The Pavilion also added a new amenity to the overall facility, The Woodforest Bank Club. The VIP suite and patio are located adjacent to the North Plaza and a new VIP entrance was added to the facility. The Club is open all year to host events for up to 150 guests for meetings, parties, mall concerts and receptions. On event nights, members of The Club can enjoy an air-conditioned room with full cash bar, along with the sights and sounds of the evening's concert artist.

At the conclusion of The Pavilion's 2000 season, another expansion and renovation project took place. The expansion increased the capacity of the lawn by an additional 3,550 guests, bringing the total capacity to nearly 17,000. A 10,000-square-foot (930 m^{2}) dressing room facility with kitchen was also added.

In 2002, a five-story parking garage was erected to ease the parking problem which plagued concert-goers since the opening of the facility. The garage is attached via a pedestrian walkway bridge over Six Pines Drive to the Woodlands Waterway Marriott Hotel & Convention Center and allows concert goers who are staying at the hotel a separate entrance to the Pavilion.

On September 13, 2008, The Pavilion was severely damaged by Hurricane Ike, which moved over the area in the early morning hours. All concerts for the remainder of the 2008 season were canceled due to extensive damage to the facility. During the height of the storm, 80–90 mph sustained winds shredded the awnings and bent the steel support structure beyond repair. The stage was also damaged during the hurricane. The new roof of the facility, which now has six peaks, took nine months to install and is currently rated to withstand sustained winds of over 175 miles per hour, thus to eliminate possibly further damage to the roof and The Pavilion's infrastructure. 2000 additional seats were added, thus bringing the capacity of the Pavilion to more than 16,000.

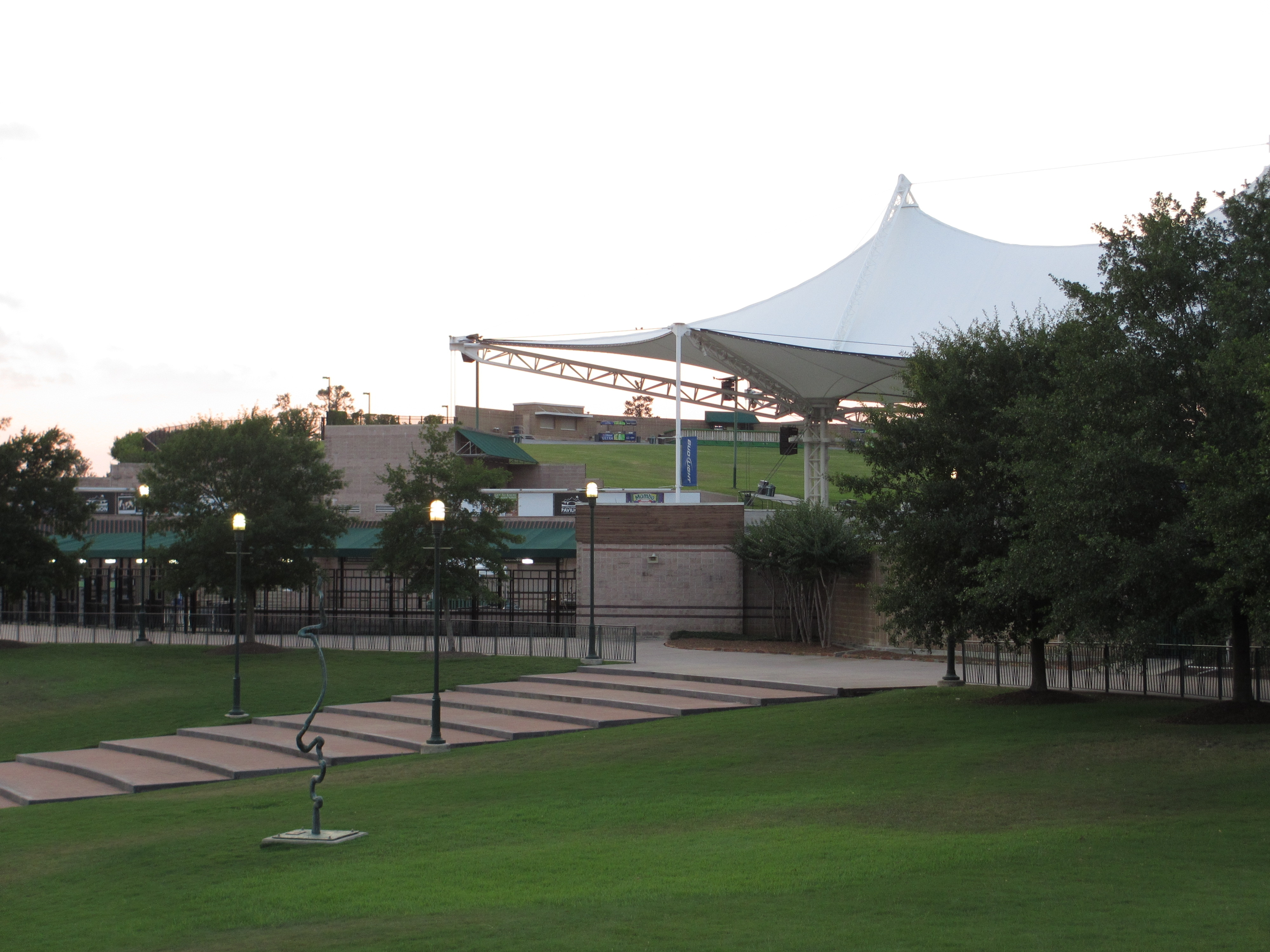
Woodlands Pavilion in 2012

== Concert events ==
The venue is host to performances of the Houston Symphony, the Houston Grand Opera, as well as the Houston Ballet and the Cheek to Cheek Tour. During these performances, lawn seating is usually provided free of charge due to a grant underwritten by various sponsors.

== See also ==
- List of contemporary amphitheaters
