= Franklin County Courthouse =

Franklin County Courthouse may refer to:

- Franklin County Courthouse, Southern District, Charleston, Arkansas, listed on the National Register of Historic Places (NRHP)
- Franklin County Courthouse (Ozark, Arkansas), NRHP-listed
- Franklin County Courthouse (Georgia), Carnesville, Georgia, NRHP-listed
- Franklin County Courthouse (Idaho), Preston, Idaho, NRHP-listed
- Franklin County Courthouse (Illinois), in Benton, Illinois
  - Fourth Franklin County Courthouse
- Franklin County Courthouse (Iowa), in Hampton, Iowa, NRHP-listed
- Franklin County Courthouse (Kansas), Ottawa, Kansas, NRHP-listed
- Franklin County Courthouse (Kentucky), in NRHP-listed Frankfort Commercial Historic District
- Franklin County Courthouse (Maine), Farmington, Maine, NRHP-listed
- Franklin County Courthouse (Mississippi), Meadville, Mississippi, NRHP-listed in Franklin County, Mississippi
- Franklin County Courthouse (Nebraska), Franklin, Nebraska, NRHP-listed
- Franklin County Courthouse (Ohio), Columbus, Ohio
  - Franklin County Courthouse (1840–1884), Columbus, Ohio
  - Franklin County Courthouse (1887–1974), Columbus, Ohio
- Franklin County Courthouse (Pennsylvania), in Chambersburg, Pennsylvania, NRHP-listed
- Franklin County Courthouse (Tennessee), in Winchester, Tennessee, NRHP-listed
- Franklin County Courthouse and Jail, Mount Vernon, Texas
- Franklin County Courthouse (Washington), Pasco, Washington, NRHP-listed
