= Franklin County Jail (Columbus, Ohio) =

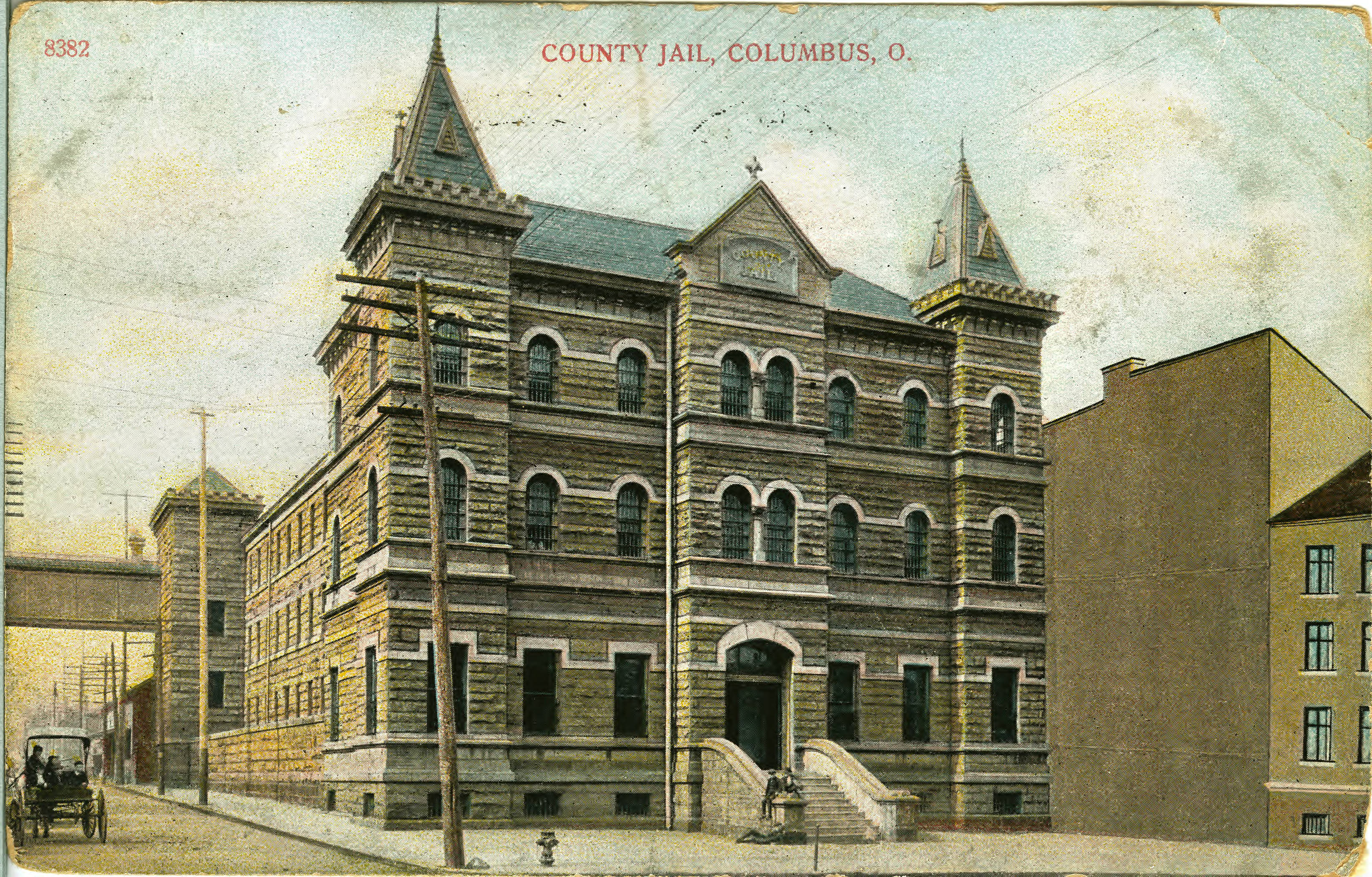
- Jail exterior, postmarked 1909

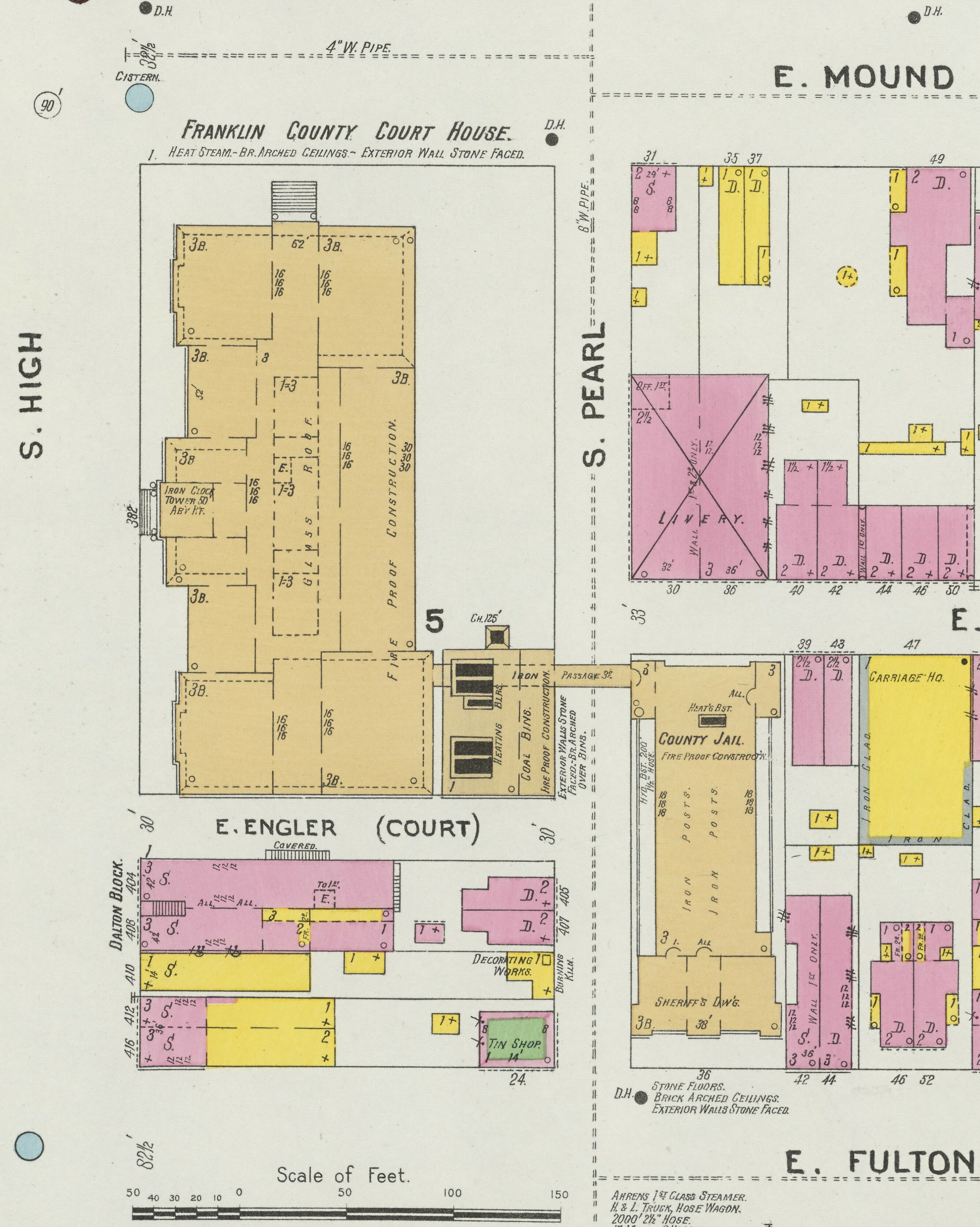
- Map of the courthouse and jail in 1901

General information
- Location: 36 E. Fulton Street, Columbus, Ohio
- Coordinates: 39.953944°N 82.997841°W
- Opened: November 21, 1889
- Closed: August 1, 1971
- Demolished: October 1971

The Franklin County Jail was a county jail building in Columbus, Ohio, administered by the Franklin County government. The building opened in 1889 and was in use until August 1971. At that time, the jail was moved to a new facility, part of the Franklin County Government Center. The 1889 structure was demolished two months later.

== Attributes ==
The building was located on Fulton Street behind the Franklin County Courthouse. A bridge linked the jail to the courthouse, allowing for secure prisoner transport between the facilities. The jail was built to house 135 prisoners.

The building was designed by Joseph Dauben or George H. Maetzel; George Bellows Sr. (father of painter George Bellows) was in charge of its construction.

== History ==
There were numerous jails built for the county over its history. The first was in 1804 in Franklinton; the first building operated by the Franklin County government. The log-built jail had two windows, a solid door, stocks, and a whipping post outside the structure. It cost the county $80 to construct. In 1808, the first county courthouse was built in Franklinton, along with a new brick jail. When Columbus became the county seat in 1824, the courthouse moved to Capitol Square and the jail to the south side of Gay Street between High and Third streets. In 1840, a new courthouse was built in Columbus, and part of its basement was used as a jail. A new jail building was constructed near this courthouse in 1865.

The building opened on November 21, 1889, two years after the opening of the 1887 Franklin County Courthouse. On the opening day, the county held an open house, allowing the public to see the building and its jail cells. The building cost $165,000. The 1889 structure closed on August 1, 1971, and was demolished in October 1971.

The structure's functions were taken over by a new Franklin County Jail, today known as the Franklin County Correctional Center I, part of the Franklin County Government Center. The building cost approximately $6.5 million.

== See also ==
- List of demolished buildings and structures in Columbus, Ohio
