= Franklin County Government Center =

County government complex in Columbus, Ohio, U.S.

Coordinates: 39°57′14″N 83°00′01″W

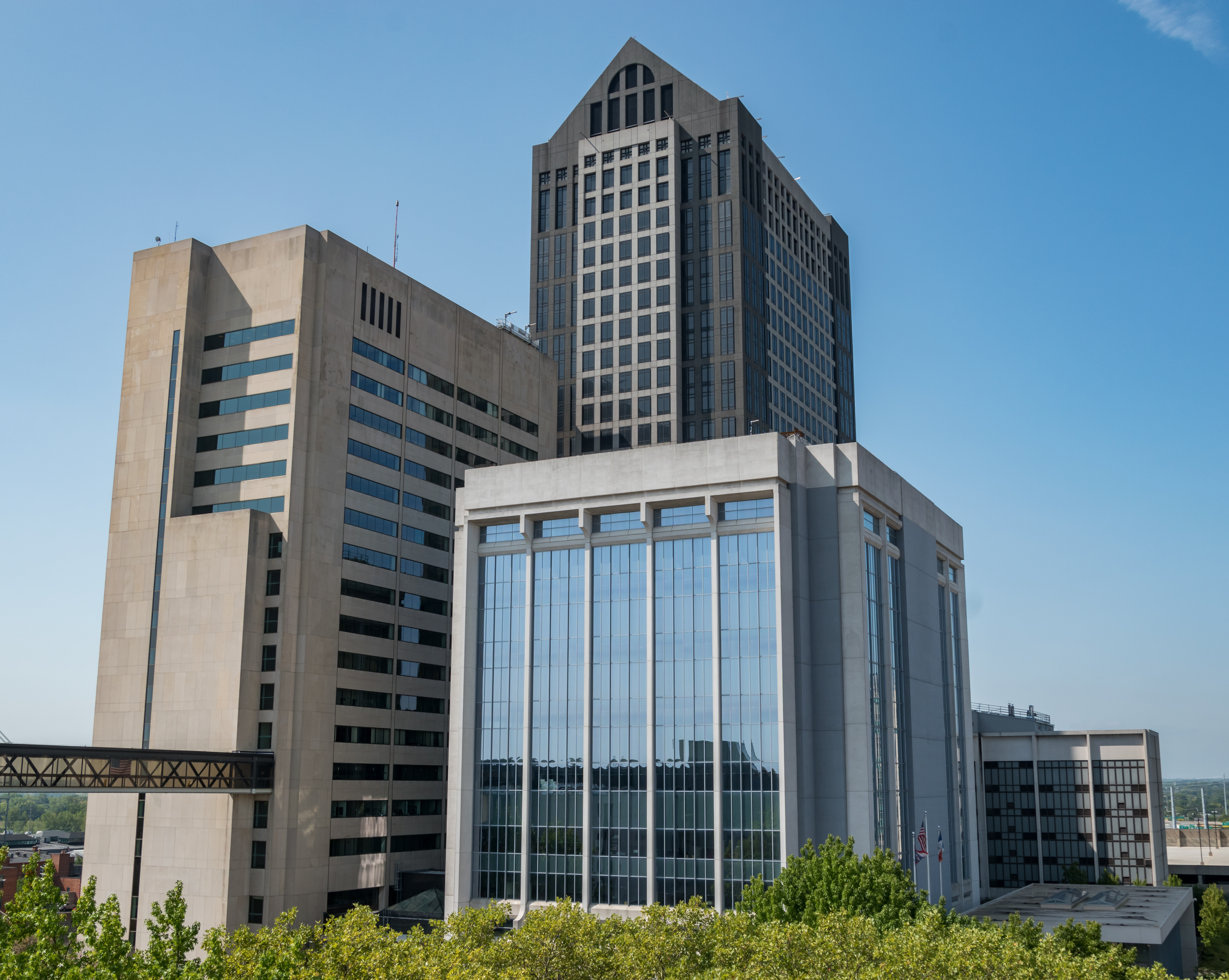
The Franklin County Government Center

Interactive map of the complex

The Franklin County Government Center is a government complex of Franklin County, Ohio in the city of Columbus. The government center has included several iterations of the Franklin County Courthouse, including a building completed in 1840 and another completed in 1887. Current courthouse functions are spread out between buildings in the complex.

== History and structures ==
The site at the southwest corner of High and Mound streets was at one time occupied by St. Paul's Church, a German Lutheran Church.

The tallest building in the complex is the 27-floor, 464-foot (141 m) Franklin County Courthouse at 373 South High Street. It is the seventh tallest building in Columbus. This was the third incarnation of the Franklin County Courthouse and hosts the majority of the county government agencies. It was designed by architectural firm DesignGroup, Inc. following the postmodern architectural style. It was built on the site of a publishing building used for decades by the county, the American Education Press Building. Since 2022, its 16th floor has hosted a cafeteria-style restaurant called Cafe Overlook, which has a panoramic view of Downtown Columbus.

Other major buildings in the complex include the 19-floor Municipal Court at 375 South High Street and the 10-floor Hall of Justice at 369 South High Street, both designed by Prindle & Patrick. The seven-floor new Franklin County Common Pleas Courthouse at 345 South High Street was completed in 2010.

The Hall of Justice at 369 South High Street began a two-year renovation in early 2013.

Other facilities in the complex include:

- Dorrian Commons Park
- Pavilion at 365 S. High Street
- James A. Karnes Building (Franklin County Sheriff's Office) at 410 S. High Street
- Franklin County Correctional Center I at 370 S. Front Street
- Juvenile Detention Center/Parking Garage at 399 S. Front Street
- 34 E. Fulton Street Parking Garage
- 80 E. Fulton Street Service Building

A large cast of Henry Moore's Oval with Points, originally installed in Dorrian Commons Park, was moved across High Street in 2014 to the plaza of the newly-remodeled Hall of Justice. The 1974 statue of Benjamin Franklin was then moved from the plaza to an interior lobby in the courthouse.

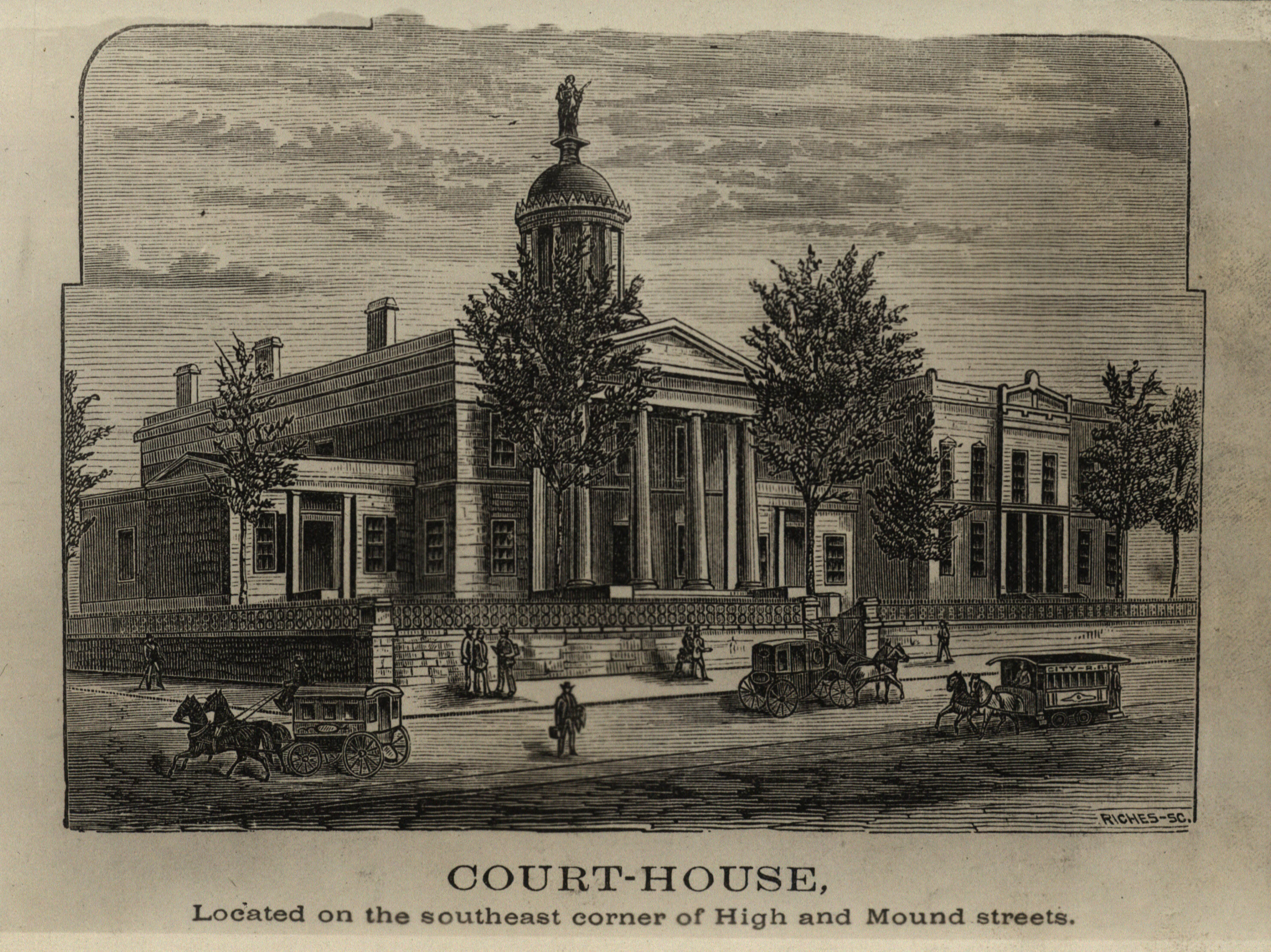
Franklin County Courthouse (1840–1884)

Franklin County Courthouse (1887–1974)

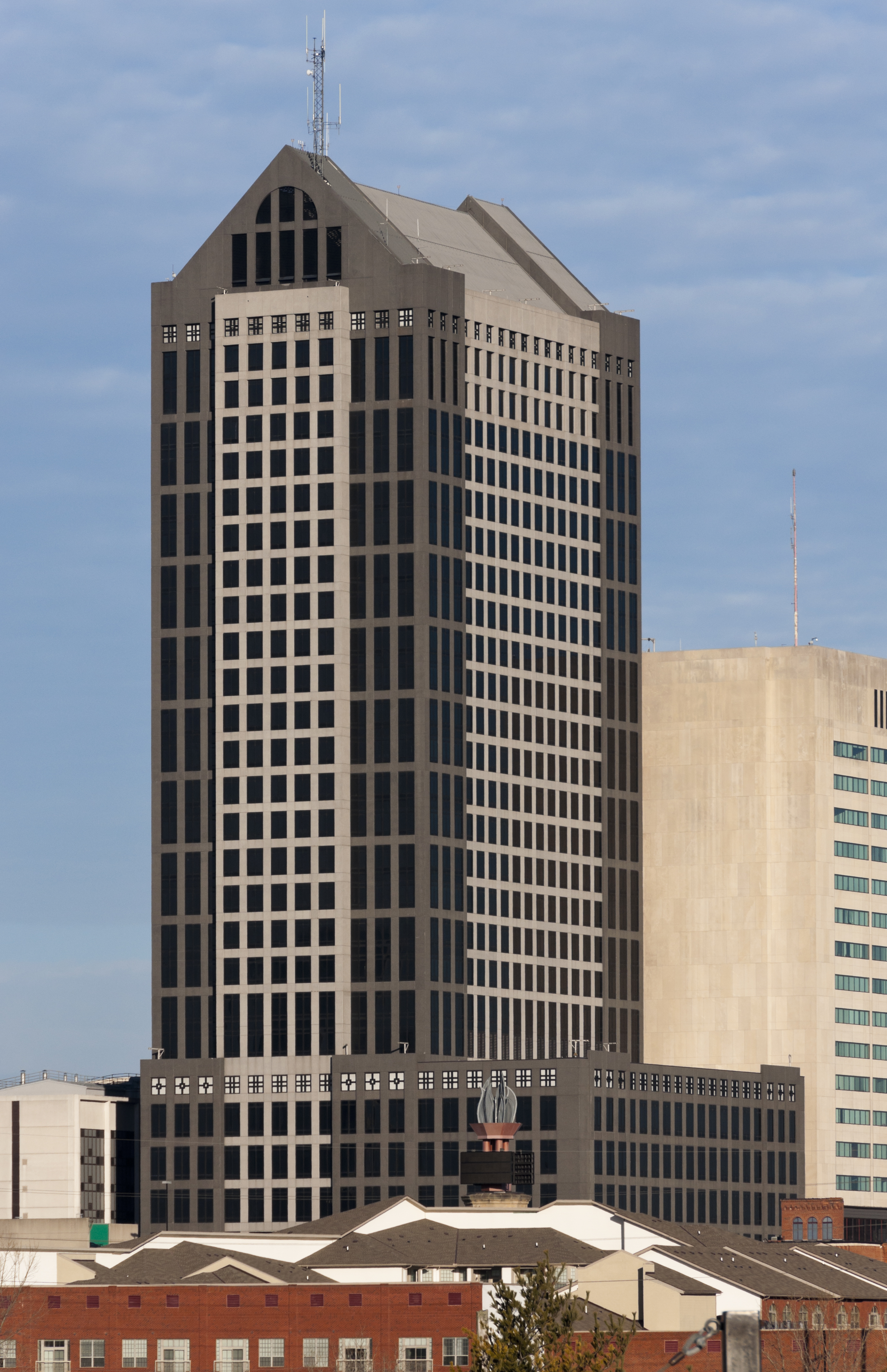
Franklin County Courthouse

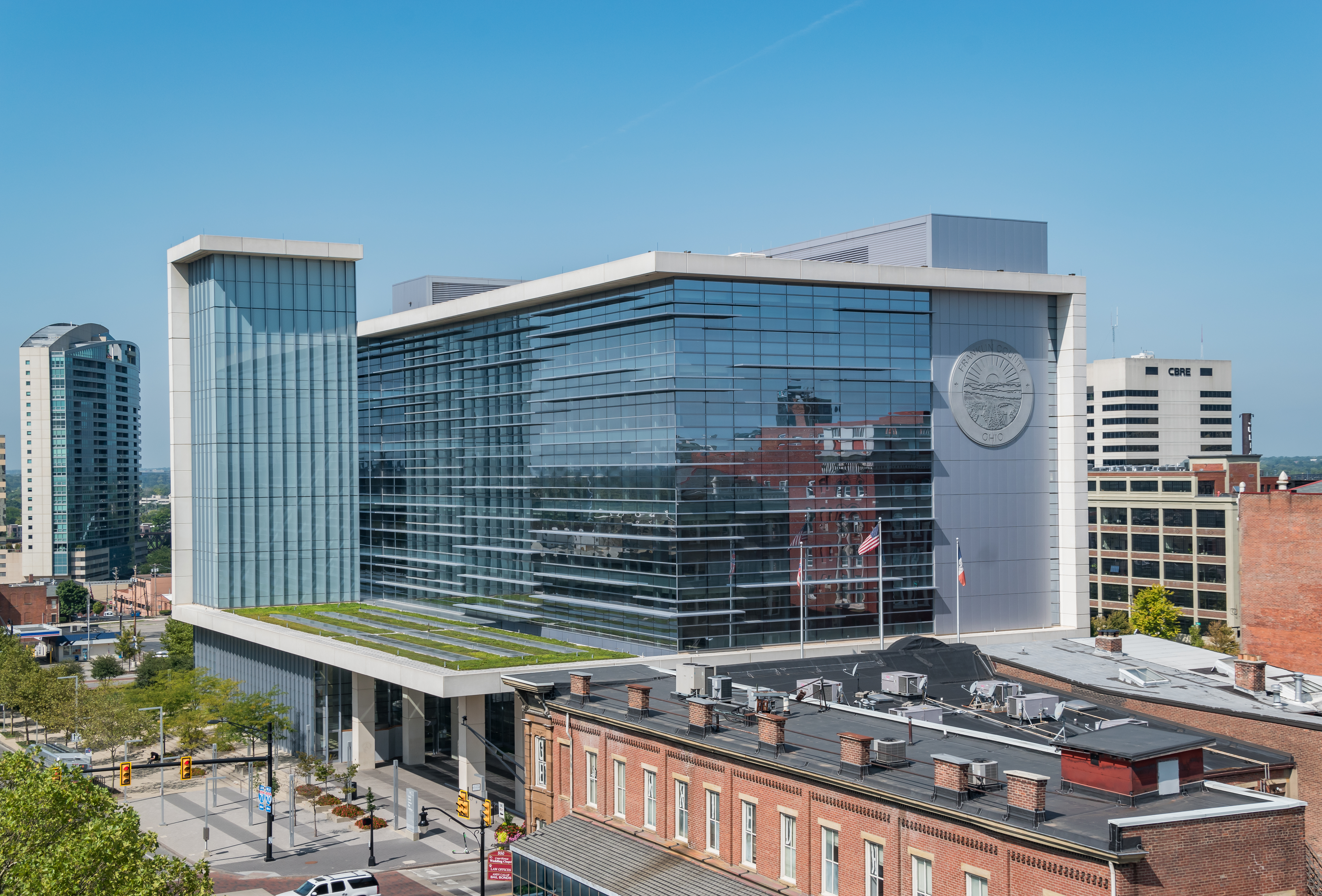
Common Pleas Courthouse

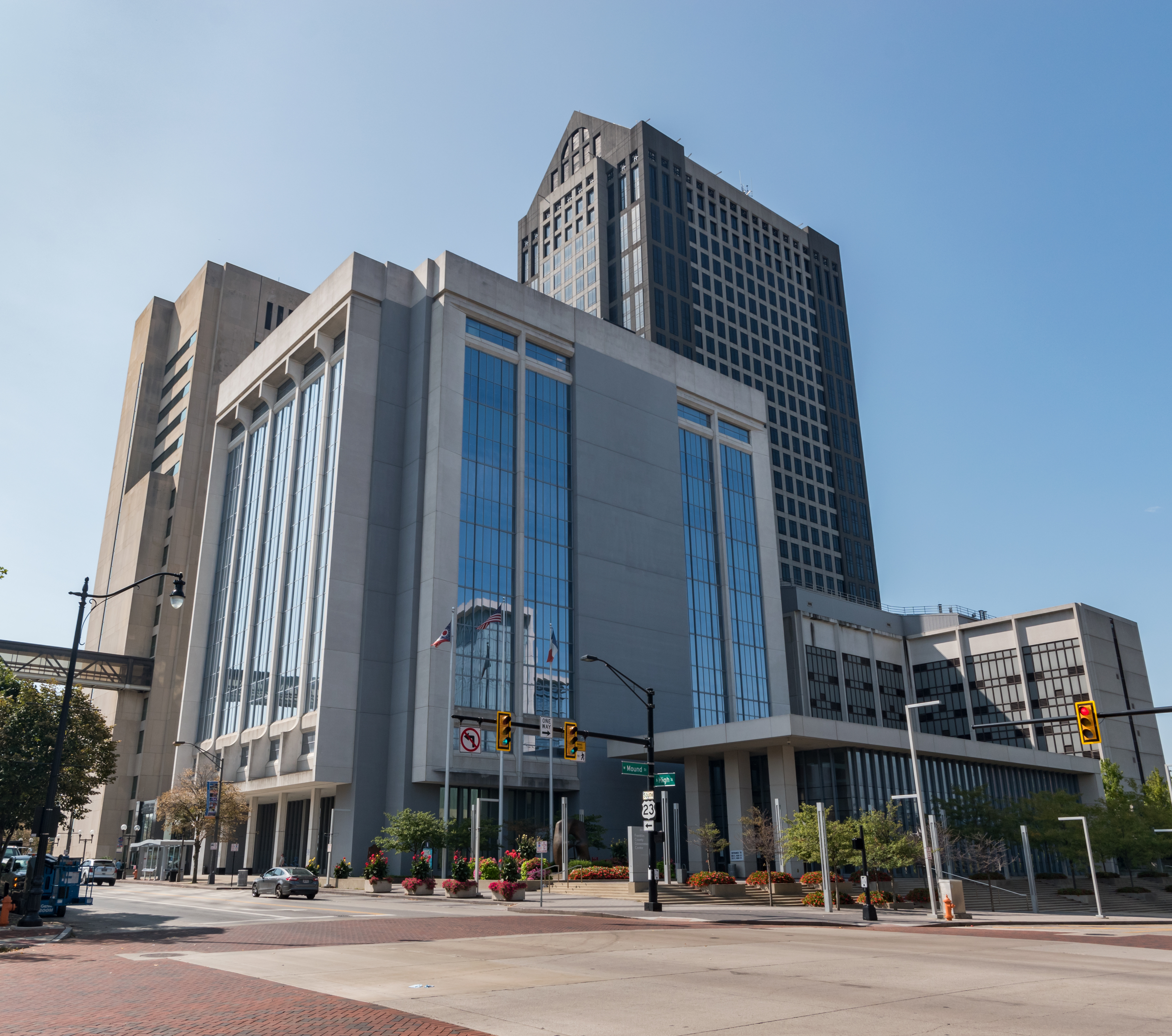
Hall of Justice

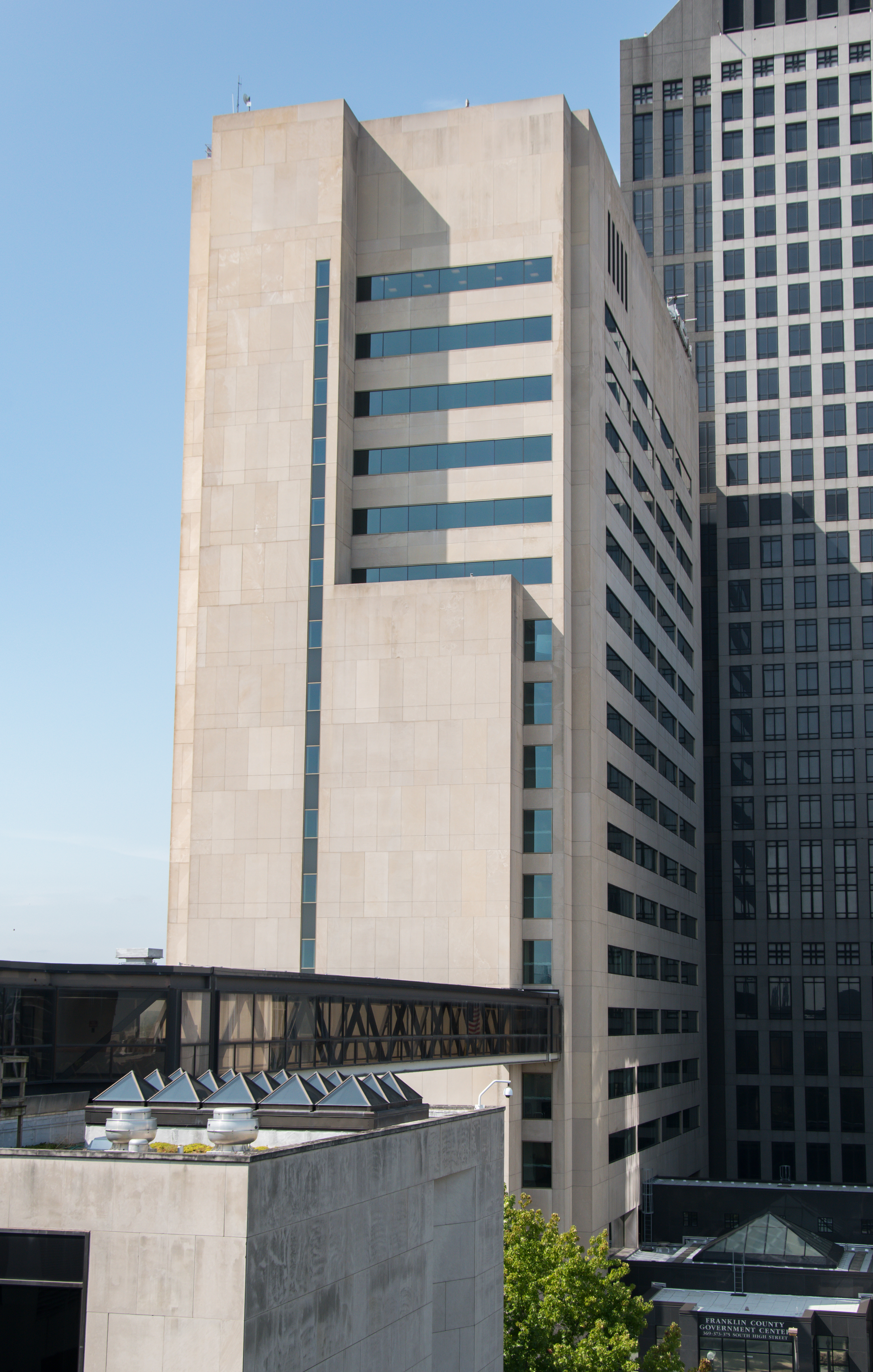
Municipal Court

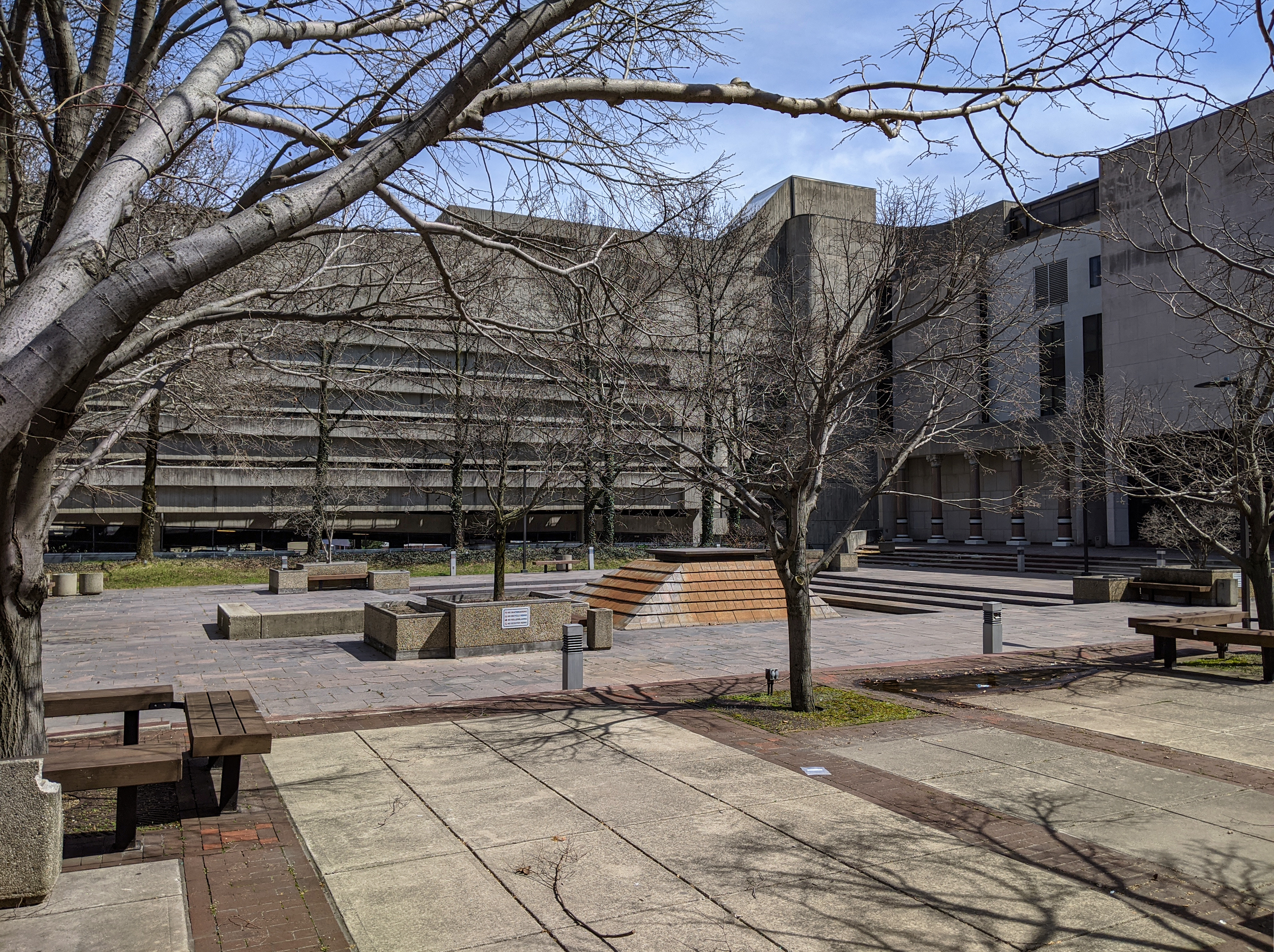
Dorrian Commons Park

== See also ==
- List of tallest buildings in Columbus, Ohio
