= Eleanor Tinsley Park =

Section of Buffalo Bayou Park in Houston, Texas

Coordinates: 29.7614°N 95.3777°W

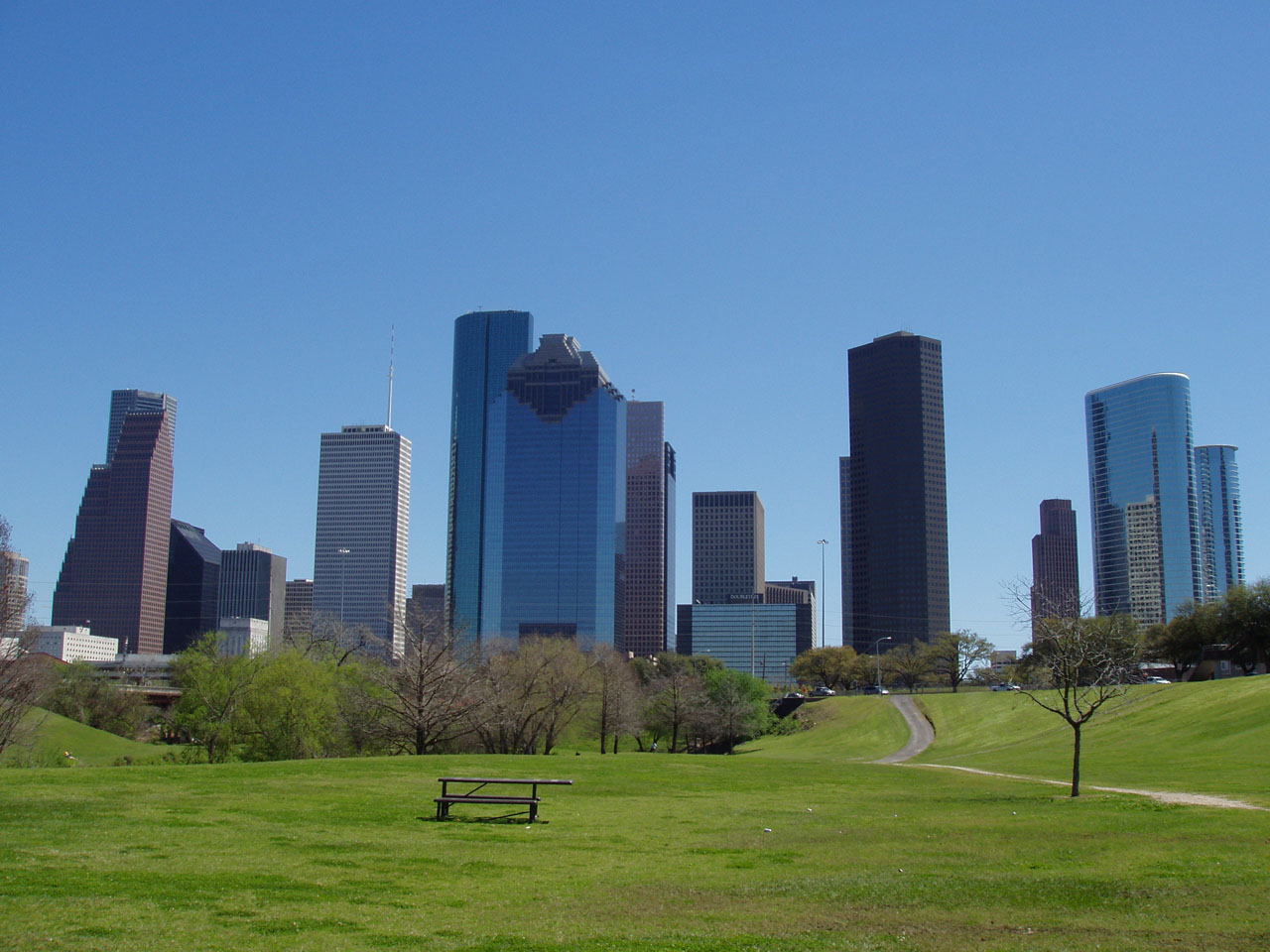
Downtown Houston from Eleanor Tinsley Park

Eleanor Tinsley Park is a section of Buffalo Bayou Park in Houston, Texas. It was designated on April 20, 1998 in honor of Eleanor Tinsley, who served as a member of the Houston City Council At-Large for 16 years.

The park houses the Lee and Joe Jamail Skatepark, the Shady Grove Victim Memorial, a Henry Moore sculpture entitled "Large Spindle Piece", the Houston Police Officers' Memorial, Glenwood Cemetery, the San Felipe playground, jogging trails, and a sand pit which can be used for volleyball.

Because the park straddles three ZIP codes (77002, 77007, and 77019) and has a nebulous shape, its street address is difficult to define. The City of Houston may list the address as 1800-3600 Allen Parkway/Memorial Drive, 77019. Alternatively, the City may list the address as 500 Allen Parkway, 77002. The City lists the park's San Felipe playground as 1717 Allen Pkwy, 77019. The City lists the park's Lee and Joe Jamail Skatepark as 103 Sabine Street, 77007.

The western border of the park is Taft Street. Its eastern border is Sabine Street. The northern border is Memorial Drive. Its southern border, Allen Parkway, is frequently closed due to parades, road running, and racewalking.

The park hosts the Free Press Summer Fest annual music festival, the Houston Art Car Parade, and the Freedom Over Texas annual Fourth of July celebration. In the past, the park hosted the Bob Marley Festival and "The Westheimer Street Festival in Exile".
