= Spindle Piece =

Sculpture series by Henry Moore

Large Spindle Piece
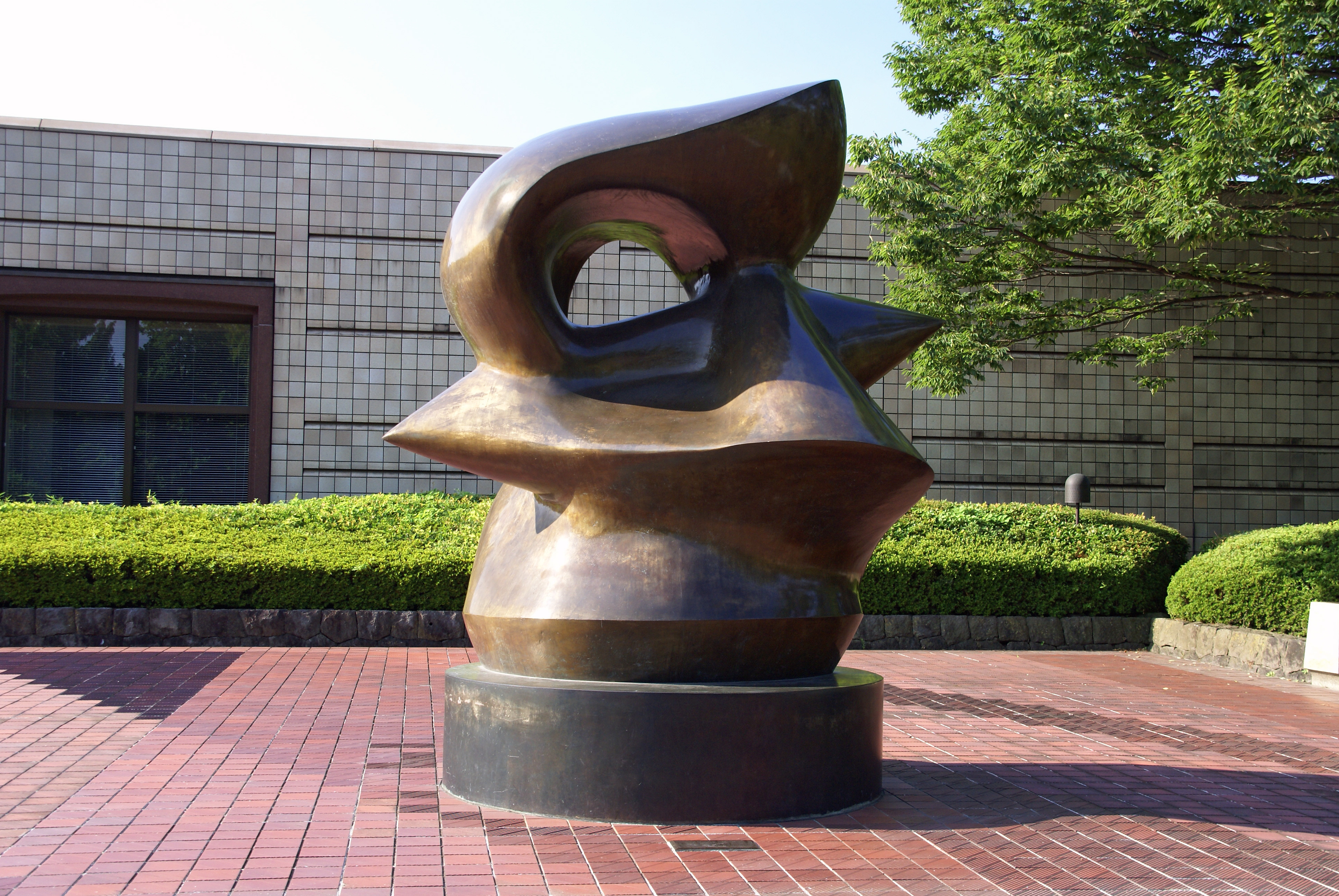
- Large Spindle Piece at Miyagi Museum of Art in Sendai, Japan
- Artist: Henry Moore
- Year: 1968
- Catalogue: LH 593
- Type: Bronze
- Dimensions: 335 cm (132 in)

Spindle Piece is a bronze sculpture series by Henry Moore. Unusually, the sculpture was made in four sizes: a plaster maquette cast in bronze as Maquette for Spindle Piece (LH 591) in 1968, a larger plaster working model which was also cast in bronze as Spindle Piece (LH 592) in 1968, a larger series of bronze sculptures Large Spindle Piece (LH 593) cast in 1974, and the largest model, known as The Spindle (LH 593a), carved in travertine in 1981.

== Background ==
The work is part of Moore's Spindle series of sculptures, which was exhibited in Hyde Park in London in 1968. The series was inspired by a detail of Michelangelo's painting on the ceiling of the Sistine Chapel, where God's hand reaches towards Adam's finger. The sculpture is an amorphous twisting flowing form, pierced by a hole, with a point bursting out from each side. The opposite points suggest the possibility of rotating the convoluted work. Moore said, "Sculpturally, [Michelangelo's painting is] two points just about to meet. This work is on the same theme, only the two fingers are going out, not in."

Moore also drew inspiration from a piece of flint, cast by Moore in clay, and drawings from 1938; and the work is related to his 1939 work Three Points (LH 211): Moore said, "Here again the points are used to give action: inwards in the case of the Three Points, but here to give action outwards." Another sculpture with a similar theme but with inward-facing points is his Oval with Points (LH 596).

== Maquette ==
Moore first made a maquette in plaster which was cast in bronze in 1968, 16 centimetres (6.3 in) high, known as Maquette for Spindle Piece (LH 591). An example is in the Metropolitan Museum of Art in New York.

== Spindle Piece ==
The maquette was enlarged into a plaster working model 84 centimetres (33 in) high which was cast in bronze at the Art Bronze Foundry in London in 1968 in an edition of "10+1" (one being retained by the artist) known as Spindle Piece (LH 592).

Examples of the bronze working model are displayed at the Hakone Open-Air Museum in Japan, and the Modern Art Centre José de Azeredo Perdigão in Lisbon. One in private hands was sold at Sotheby's in February 2013 for £301,250.

== Large Spindle Piece ==
The working model was then enlarged to create an edition of "6+1" bronzes (including the artist's cast, numbered "0/6"), cast by the Hermann Noack foundry in Berlin in 1974, entitled Large Spindle Piece, which is 3.35 metres (132 in) high.

The Large Spindle Piece casts are displayed at:

- The science quadrangle at Kenyon College in Gambier, Ohio
- Eleanor Tinsley Park in Buffalo Bayou Park in Houston, Texas (originally sited at Tranquility Park, Houston) (cast 4/6)
- Corniche Road in Jeddah, Saudi Arabia
- Hakone Open-Air Museum in Hakone Japan
- Miyagi Museum of Art in Sendai, Japan
- North Carolina Museum of Art in Raleigh, North Carolina
- the sculptor's model (cast 0/6) which was displayed at the British Council in Spring Gardens near Trafalgar Square in London from 1981 to 1996; after a period at the Henry Moore Foundation in Perry Green, Hertfordshire, and at the Yorkshire Sculpture Park, it has been loaned to Network Rail to stand outside King's Cross station in London.

The large model was enlarged again and carved in travertine marble in Italy in 1981; the work, known as The Spindle, is 4.5 metres (180 in) high and weighs about 70 tons. The stone sculpture was dropped in Italy and required extensive repair before it was shipped to the US to become the centrepiece of a fountain in the lobby of the InterContinental Miami which was built around the monumental sculpture. It is the largest sculpture by Moore in private ownership.

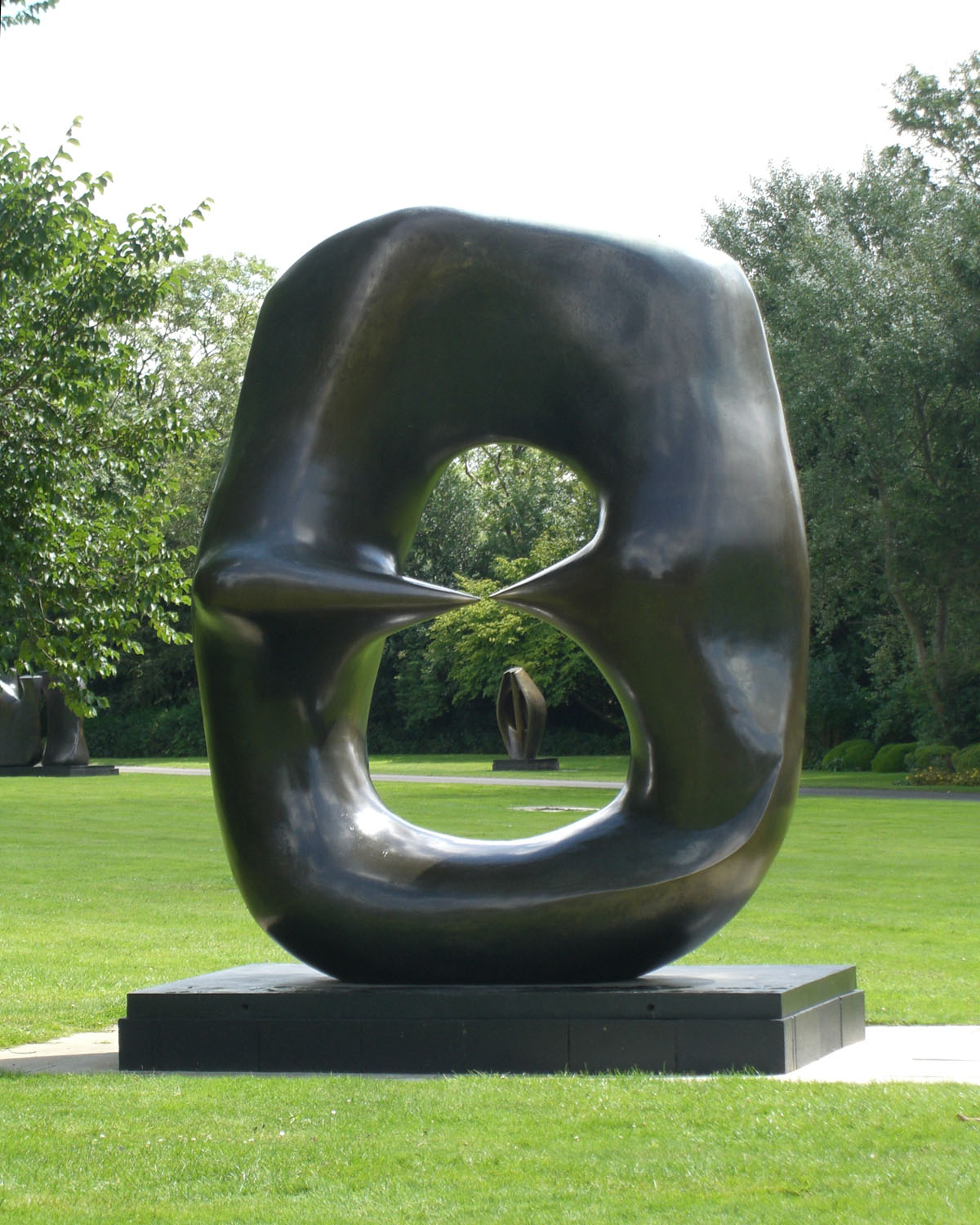
Oval with Points (LH 596)

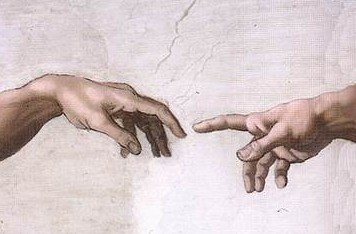
Detail from the Sistine Chapel ceiling

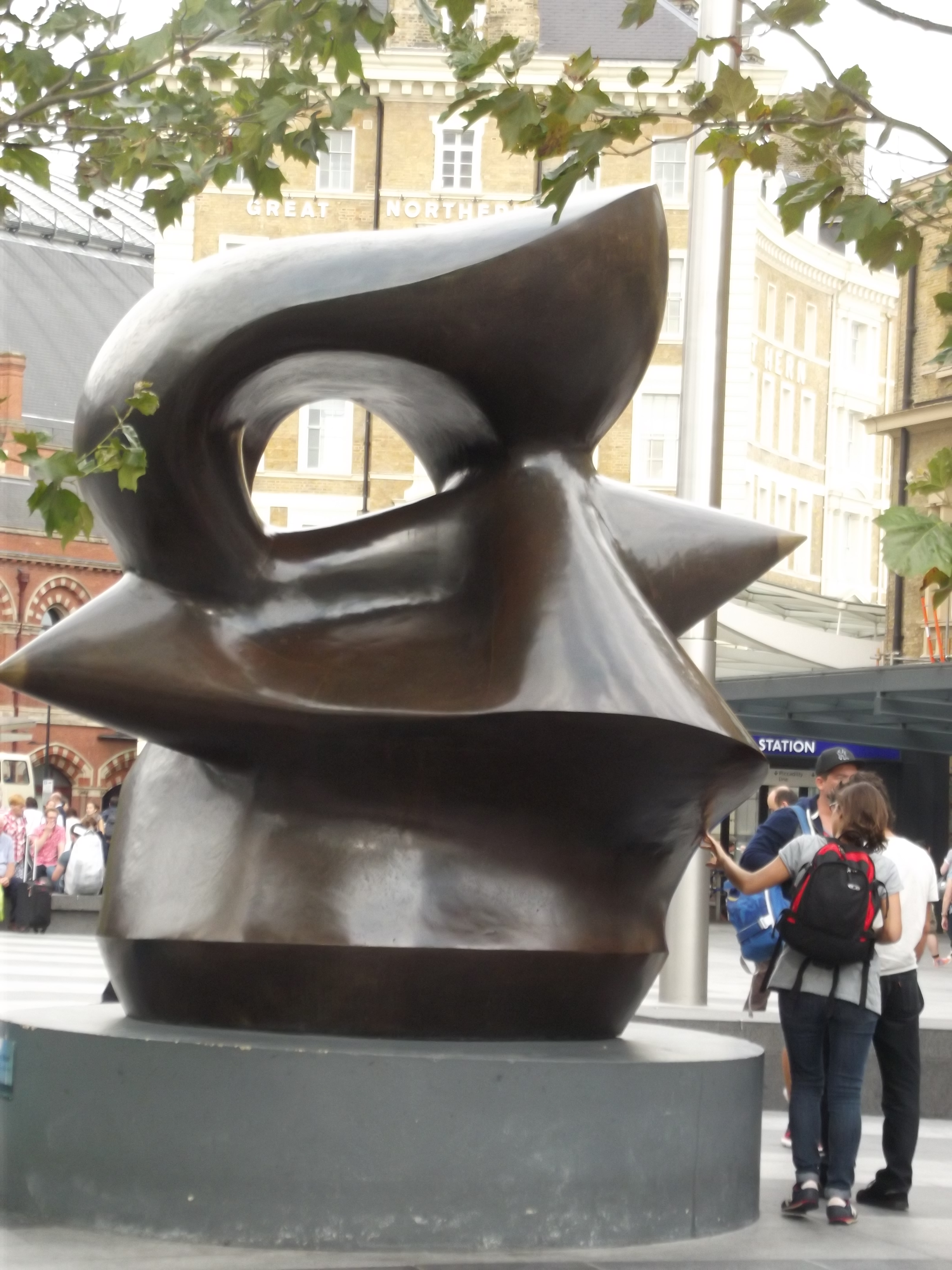
Sculptor's model outside King's Cross station

== See also ==
- List of sculptures by Henry Moore
