= Dorrian Commons Park =

Former park in Columbus, Ohio, U.S.

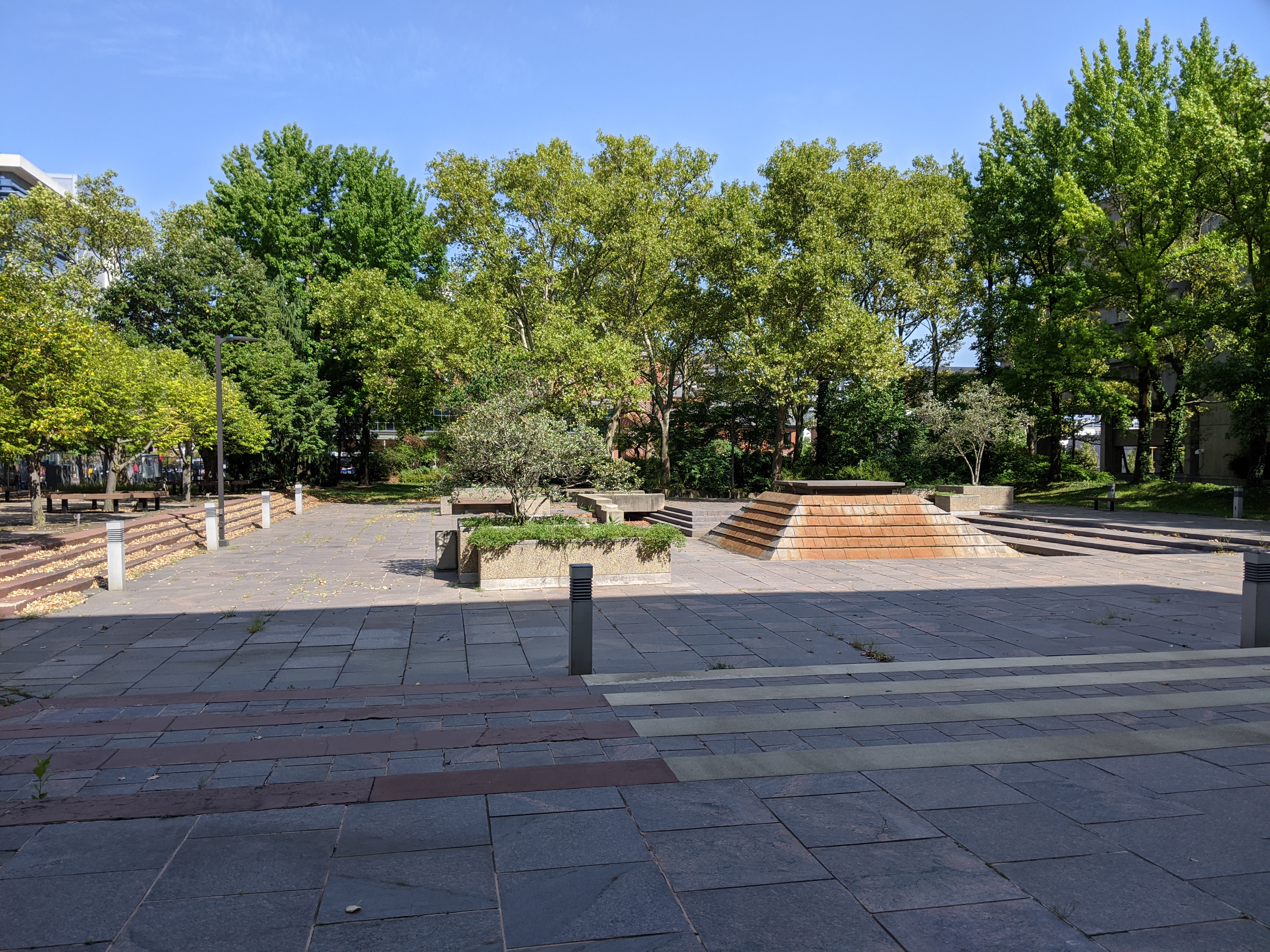
- Park plaza and fountain in 2020
- Interactive map of Dorrian Commons Park
- Coordinates: 39°57′16″N 82°59′55″W
- Opened: 1976
- Closed: 2018
- Public transit: 1, 2, 4, 5, 8, 51, 52, 61, CMAX

Dorrian Commons Park was a park and part of the Franklin County Government Center in downtown Columbus, Ohio, United States. The park opened in 1976 on the site of the first and second Franklin County Courthouse, built in 1887. Dorrian Commons closed in 2018, pending construction of a new courthouse.

== History ==
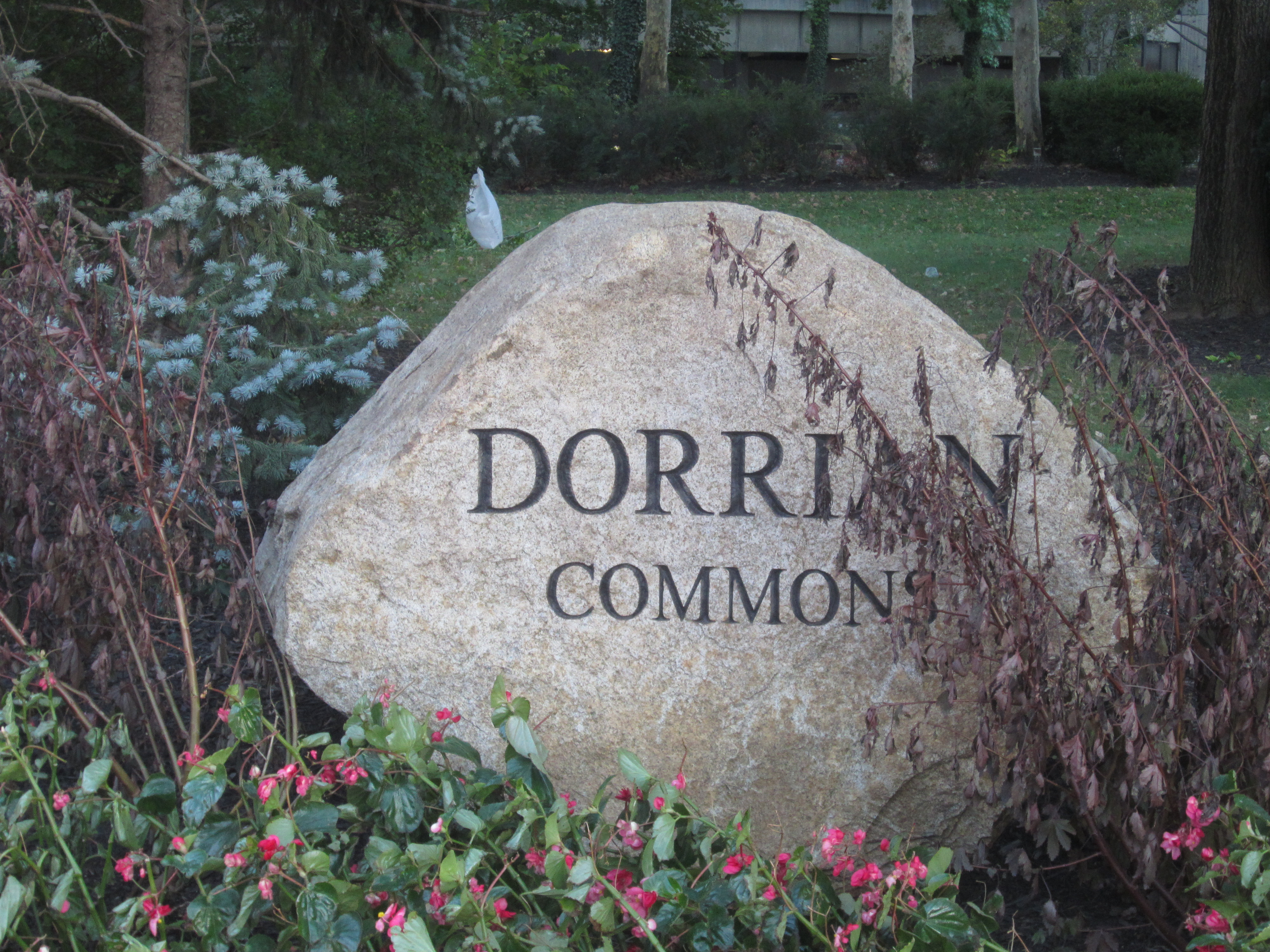
Inscription with the park's name, 2018

The second Franklin County Courthouse, built in 1887, stood on the site until its demolition in 1974. The park opened in 1976.

The park has a metal sculpture by an unknown artist. A large cast of Henry Moore's Oval with Points was originally installed in Dorrian Commons Park. The sculpture was moved across High Street in 2014 to the plaza of the newly remodeled Hall of Justice of the Franklin County Government Center.

The park was scheduled to be demolished in 2003, to be replaced with acommon pleas courthouse, but that project moved and was built north of the government center complex. Then in 2018 it (along with the adjacent James A. Karnes Building) was scheduled to be demolished and replaced by a county municipal courthouse to open in 2029. The park fountain was turned off in August 2018 and the park was closed off in December 2018. In 2026, a few months after the park's trees were cut down, plans for the new courthouse were cancelled due to project cost increases. The park is now slated to reopen as a green space.
