= Oval with Points =

Sculpture series by Henry Moore

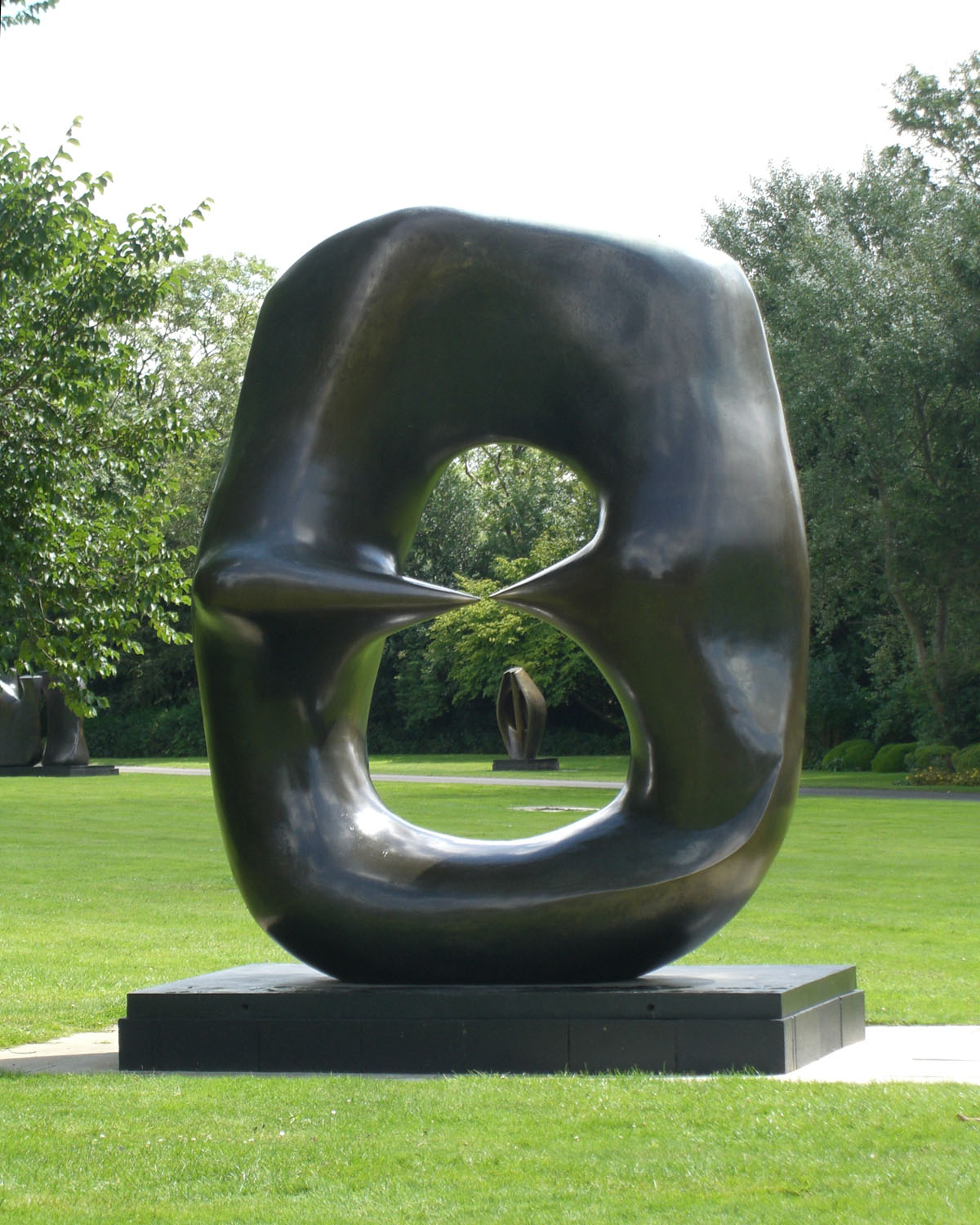
- at the Henry Moore Foundation in Perry Green, Hertfordshire
- Artist: Henry Moore
- Year: 1968 to 1970
- Catalogue: LH 596
- Medium: Plaster and bronze
- Dimensions: 332 cm (131 in)

Oval with Points is a series of enigmatic abstract sculptures by British sculptor Henry Moore, made in plaster and bronze from 1968 to 1970, from a 14-centimetre (5.5 in) maquette in 1968 (LH 594) made in plaster and then cast in bronze, through a 110-centimetre (43 in) working model in 1968–1969 (LH 595) also made plaster and then cast in bronze, to a full-size 332-centimetre (131 in) bronze version cast in 1969 (LH 596).

== Description ==
The sculpture is a flattened oval ring with rounded edges, pierced by a large hole. The inside edge of the hole has two protrusions rising from opposite sides and narrowing to sharp points that almost meet at the centre of the hole, creating a sense of energy and dynamic tension. The points divide the hole into two areas, a smaller one above and a larger one below, like a figure 8, with the shape of the void sometimes interpreted as resembling a human form with a head and a torso.

The beginnings of the sculpture can be traced in Moore's works back to a sculpture made in 1939–40, Three Points, and some drawings from 1940. Moore was often inspired by found natural objects, such as stone with a hole. The work may draw inspiration from an elephant skull collected in East Africa by Sir Julian Huxley and displayed in his garden, and later given to Moore as a gift. Oval with Points is also related to other Moore sculptures, included his Spindle Piece and Two Piece Points: Skull, both of which have two points facing outwards rather than inwards. Moore himself later mentioned a link in his mind to spark plugs.

Moore made a plaster maquette of Oval with Points (LH 594) in 1968, which was then cast in bronze in an edition of 9+1 (nine castings plus an artist's copy). It measures 16.4 by 13.9 by 9.4 centimetres (6.5 in × 5.5 in × 3.7 in). The plaster maquette and the bronze artist's copy, cast 0, are held by the Henry Moore Foundation in Perry Green, Hertfordshire. Another example is at the Art Gallery of Ontario.

Moore increased the scale of the work in 1968–69, to create Working Model for Oval With Points (LH 595) measuring 118 by 92 by 54 centimetres (46 in × 36 in × 21 in). The sculpture was originally modelled in plaster, which is now held at the Henry Moore Sculpture Centre at the Art Gallery of Ontario. This was cast in an edition of 12+2 bronzes (i.e. two artist's copies, and 12 other casts). These two artist's copies are now held by the Henry Moore Foundation, along with two plaster casts of this working model. Other bronze casts are owned by the Museum of Modern Art in New York (not currently on view), the San Francisco Museum of Modern Art (not currently on view), the Tehran Museum of Contemporary Art (on display), and the University of California, Los Angeles (currently on display in the UCLA School of Medicine building).

Finally, in 1969, Moore increased the scale again to create a full-size bronze version (LH 596) which is 332 centimetres (131 in) high. It was cast in an edition of 6+1 (six plus one artist's model) by Morris Singer. Examples of the full size work are displayed at:

- the Henry Moore Foundation, in Perry Green, Hertfordshire (cast 0)
- at Princeton University, on a site of which was formerly the location of Reunion Hall before it was demolished in 1966 (cast 1)
- the centre of a fountain in Exchange Square in Hong Kong (cast 3)
- across from Dorrian Commons Park in Columbus, Ohio (cast 4)
- the Corniche Road in Jeddah (cast 5) (acquired in 1977, along with a cast of Large Spindle Piece and Three Piece Reclining Figure No .1) )
- outside the Kunsthalle Bielefeld (cast 6)
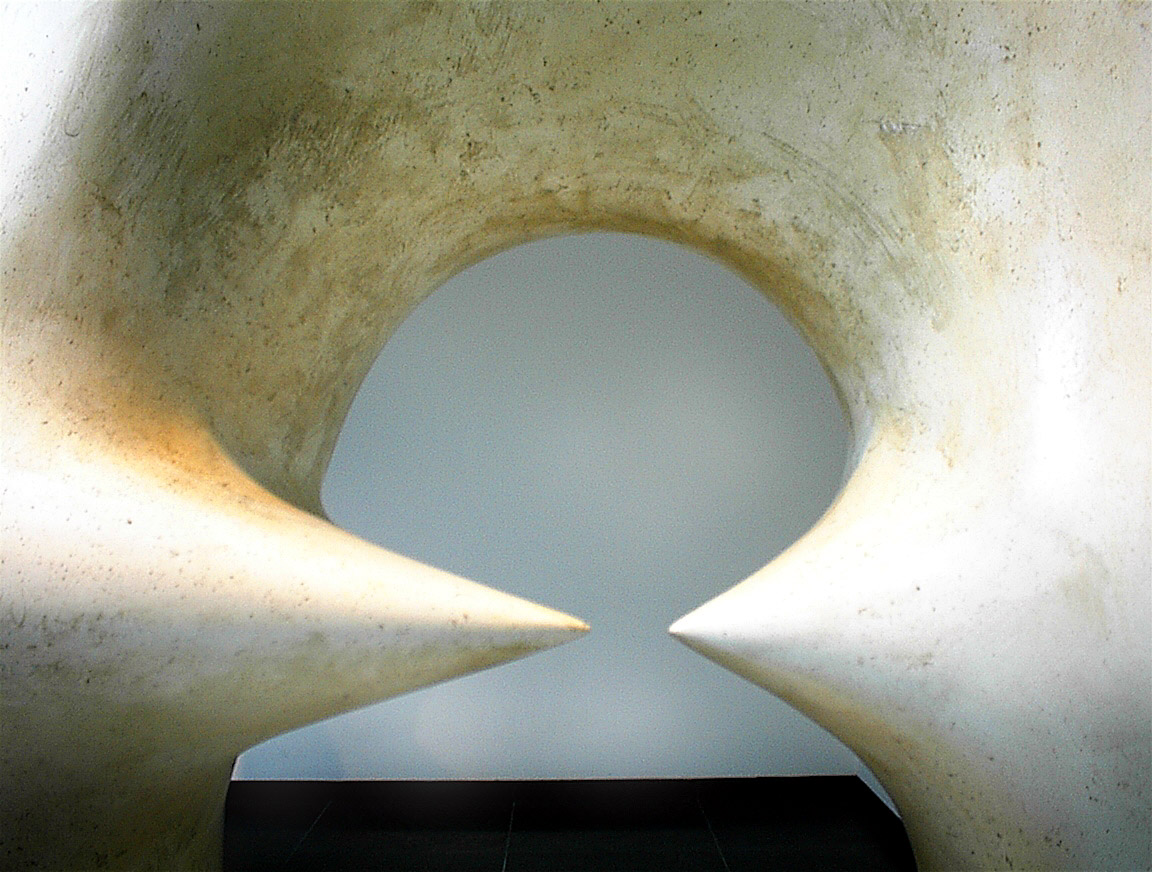
Part of the Working Model in Toronto

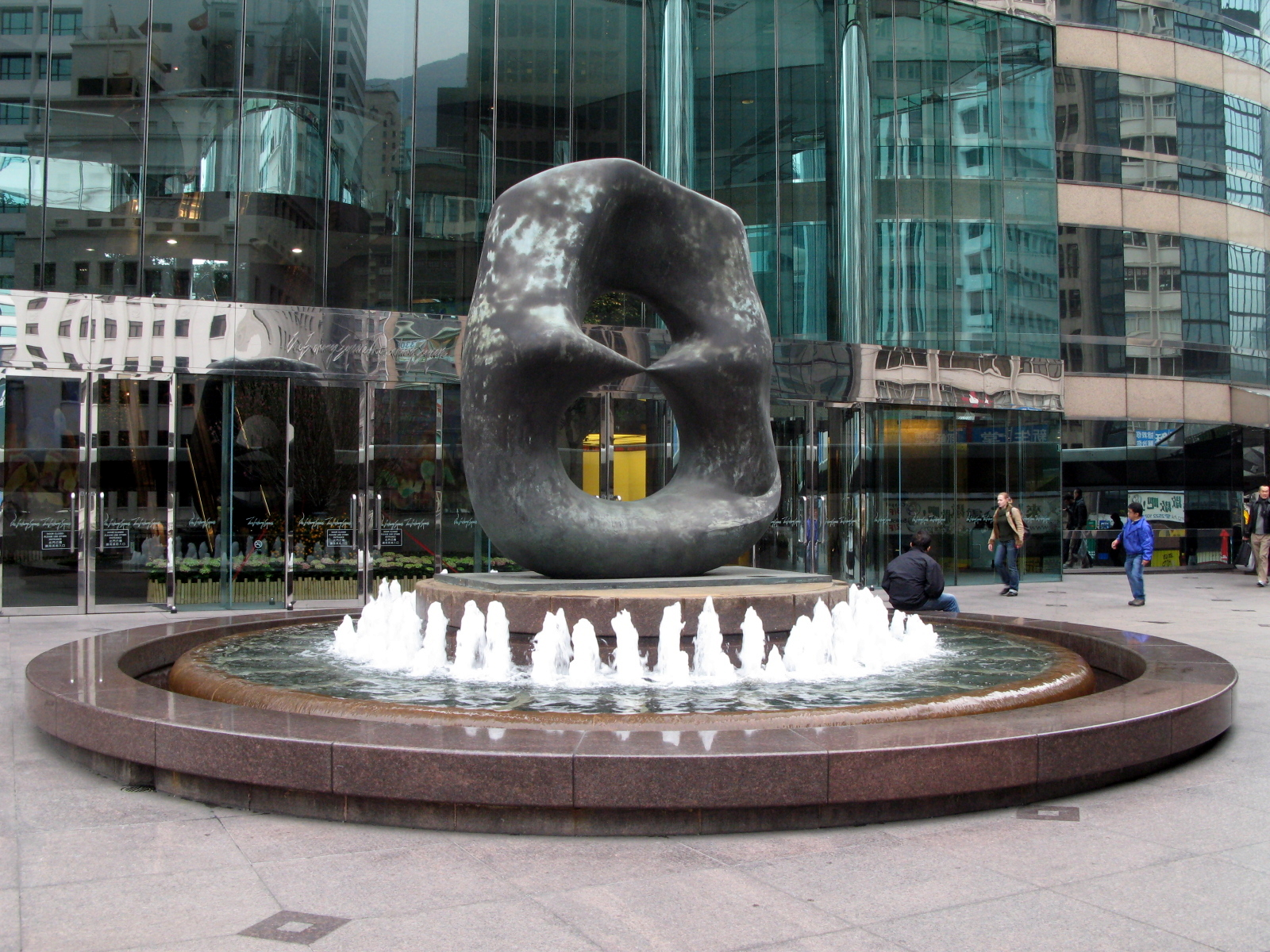
Exchange Square, Hong Kong

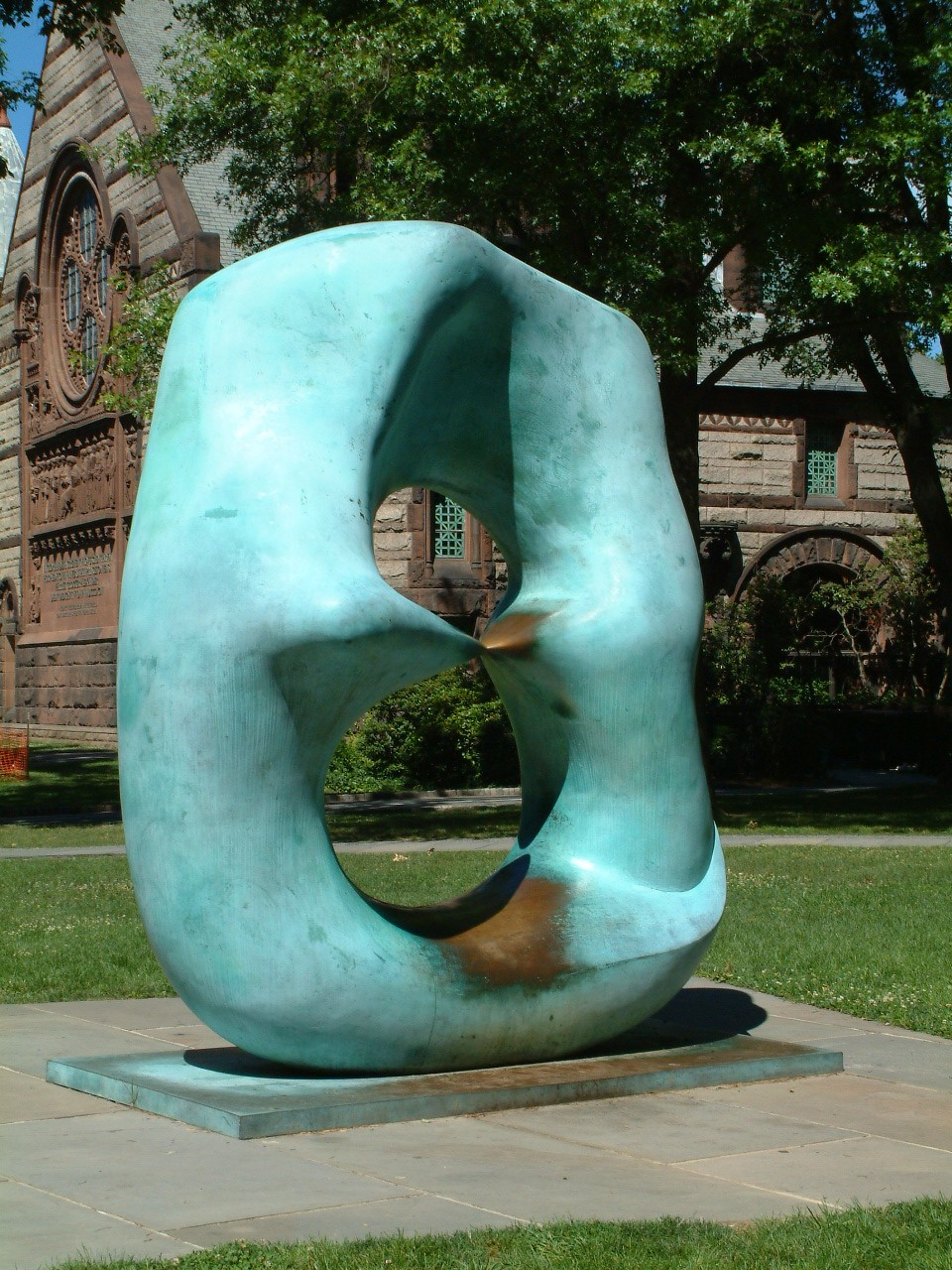
Princeton

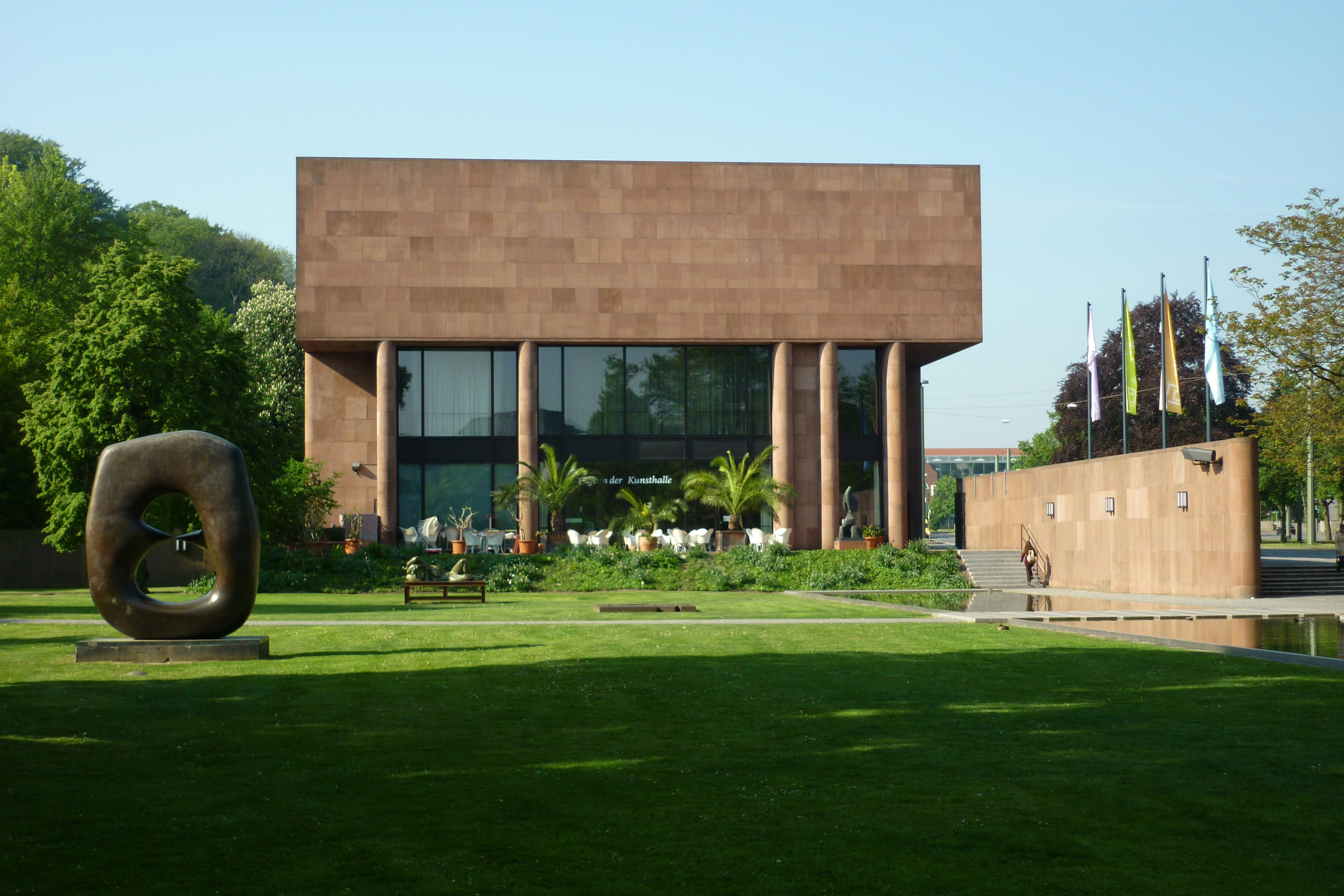
Kunsthalle Bielefeld

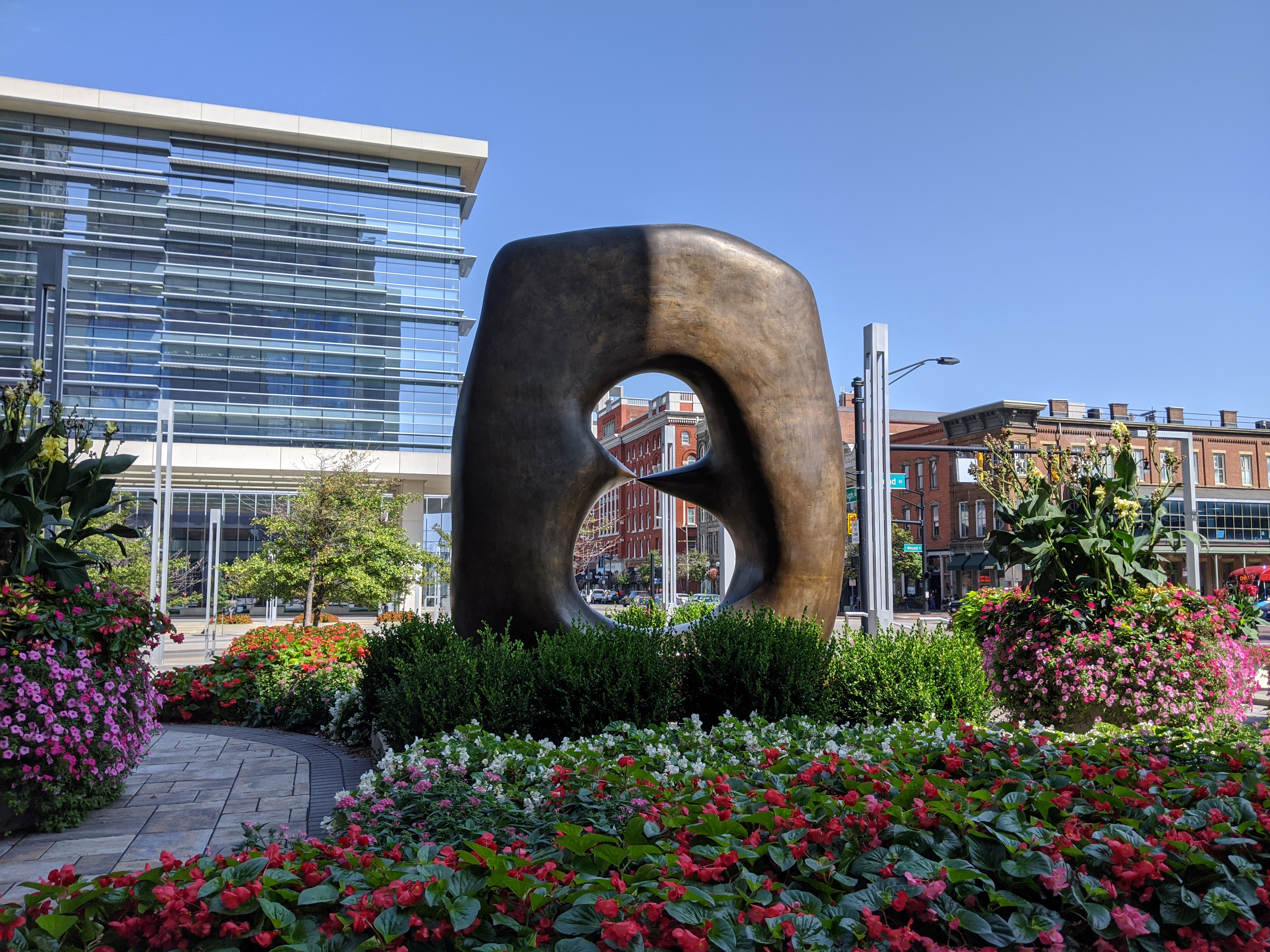
Columbus

== See also ==
- List of sculptures by Henry Moore
