= Franklin County Courthouse (1840–1884) =

Former courthouse of Franklin County, Ohio

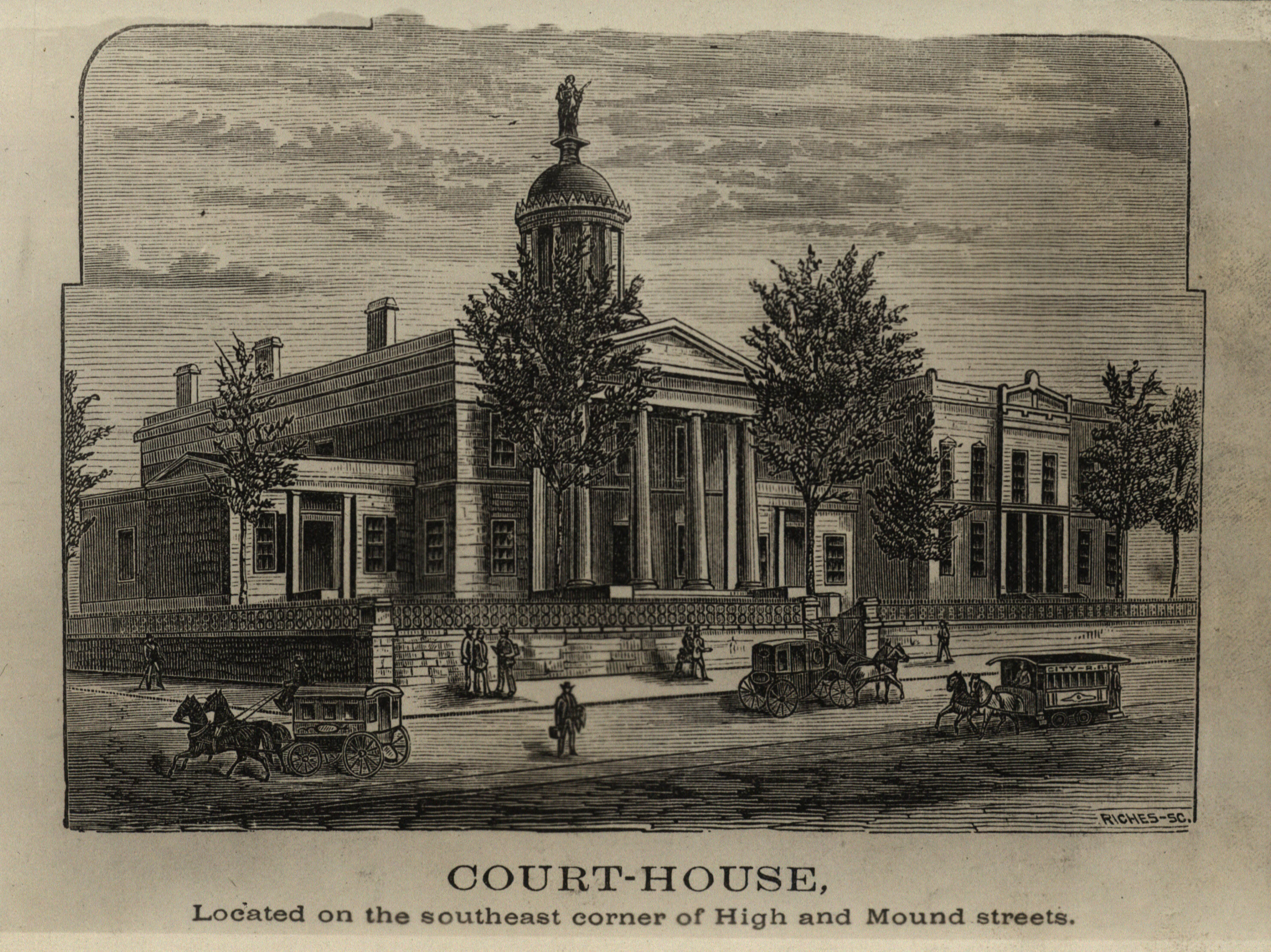
- The courthouse c. 1873
- Present-day site of the building

General information
- Location: 380 S. High St., Columbus, Ohio
- Coordinates: 39.9545°N 82.9985°W
- Completed: 1840
- Demolished: 1884

The 1840 Franklin County Courthouse was the first permanent courthouse of Franklin County, Ohio in the United States. The building, located in the county seat of Columbus, stood from 1840 to 1884. The building was replaced with another county courthouse in 1887, and after its demise, that courthouse was replaced with Dorrian Commons Park, open from 1976 to 2018; the courthouse moved to a new building nearby. The site is now planned to host the Franklin County Municipal Court.

== Attributes ==
The building was a two-story stone structure. It had a tall Ionic columned portico, a centered dome, and two wings with columns in antis.

== History ==
=== Prior spaces ===
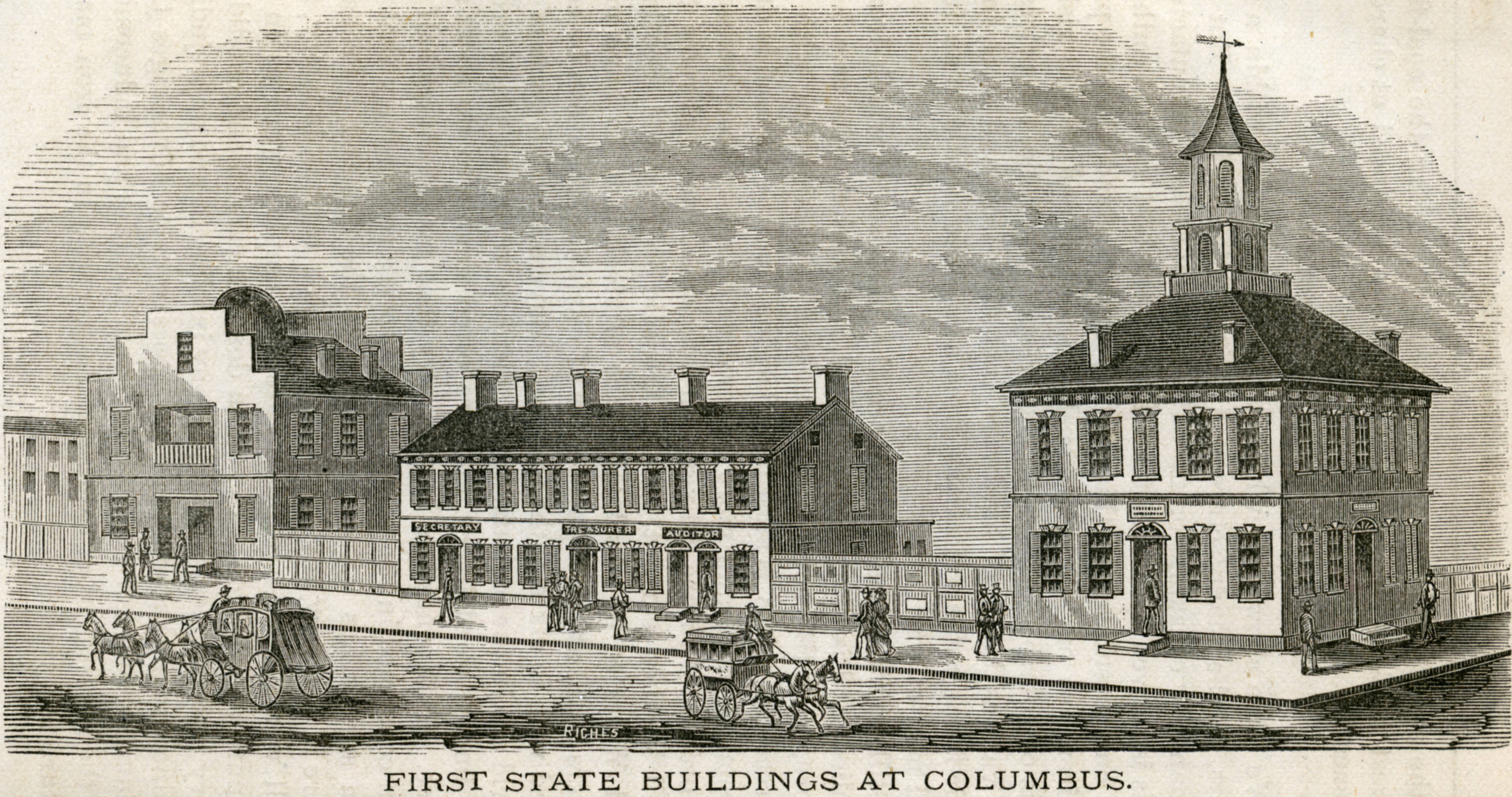
U.S. District Court Building, at left

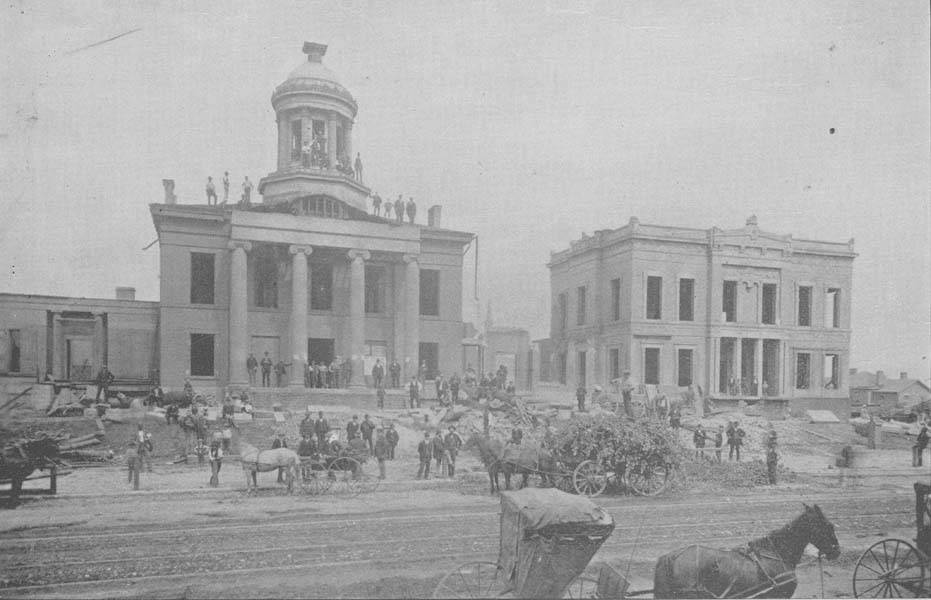
Demolishing the courthouse in 1884

The first spaces for the court was in rented rooms, and the first county building was a log jail ordered built in 1804; it is not known whether the building housed records. The first courthouse was built 1807-08 in Franklinton, its awarded builder was Lucas Sullivant, also first clerk of the court and founder of Franklinton, then the county seat. After the county government moved to Columbus in 1824, the court moved to the U.S. District Court Building on the northwest corner of Capitol Square. In 1828 or 1829, after the space was found inadequate, an office building was built at the rear of the court building; these buildings held the county court until 1840.

=== 1840 courthouse ===
With the growth of Columbus and settlement of its adjacent areas, county business increased, prompting discussion of a permanent courthouse. In 1837, a site was donated to the county at Mound and High Streets, so long as a courthouse was built there. The first permanent courthouse was then built, and completed in 1840. The two-story brick and stone building cost $41,000. An annex was built to its south in 1853. A jail was added to the complex in 1865, along with other expansions around the same time.

A fire destroyed many records in this courthouse in 1879, prompting discussion of a new courthouse building. In 1882, a Columbus Dispatch editorial urged construction of a new courthouse, detailing that the then-current structures were "inadequate in every way". The writer found the buildings to be small, impossible to clean, and with bad ventilation, among other issues. The 1887 Franklin County Courthouse was built on its site from 1884 to 1887.

A stone fountain, once outside the courthouse at High and Mound streets, was moved to Livingston Avenue and Fifth Street after demolition of the 1840 structure.

== See also ==
- Franklin County Jail (Columbus, Ohio)
- List of demolished buildings and structures in Columbus, Ohio
